Bibliography of the 1594 written works from Indian spiritual leader Sri Chinmoy (1931–2007), sorted by date of first-editions.

Bibliography 

 (1970) Meditations. Food for the Soul —Aphorisms
 (1970) My Ivy League Leaves —Lectures
 (1970) Yoga and the Spiritual Life. The Journey of India's Soul —Discourses; Answers
 (1971) Love Realised, Surrender Fulfilled, Oneness Manifested —Short stories
 (1971) My Rose Petals, part 1 —Lectures
 (1971) Children's Conversations with God  —Conversations
 (1971) My God Then God Now —Poetry
 (1971) My Lord's Secrets Revealed —Poetry; Conversations
 (1971) Songs of the Soul —Discourses
 (1972) Arise! Awake! Thoughts of a Yogi —Aphorisms; Poetry
 (1972) My Flute —Poetry
 (1972) God Wants to Read This Book —Aphorisms
 (1972) The Upanishads: The Crown of India's Soul —Lectures
 (1972) In Search of a Perfect Disciple —Short stories
 (1972) The Garland of Nation-Souls —Talks
 (1972) Eternity's Breath —Discourses; Aphorisms
 (1972) The Vedas: Immortality's First Call —Lectures 
 (1972) A Seeker's Universe —Poetry
 (1973) The Supreme and His Four Children. Five Spiritual Dictionaries —Commentary; Poetry
 (1973) Mother, Give Me the Light of Knowledge —Commentary; Poetry
 (1973) The Disciple Illumines the Master —Plays
 (1973) Commentary on the Bhagavad Gita: the Song of the Transcendental Soul —Commentary; Discourses
 (1973) God's Hour —Aphorisms
 (1973) Supreme Sacrifice —Plays
 (1973) The Heart of a Holy Man —Plays
 (1973) Singer of the Eternal Beyond —Plays
 (1973) My Rama Is My All —Plays
 (1973) Siddhartha Becomes the Buddha —Plays
 (1973) Lord Gauranga: Love Incarnate —Plays
 (1973) The Son —Plays
 (1973) Drink, Drink My Mother's Nectar —Plays
 (1973) The Dance of Life, part 01 —Poetry
 (1973) The Dance of Life, part 02 —Poetry
 (1973) The Dance of Life, part 03 —Poetry
 (1973) The Dance of Life, part 04 —Poetry
 (1973) The Dance of Life, part 05 —Poetry
 (1973) The Dance of Life, part 06 —Poetry
 (1973) The Dance of Life, part 07 —Poetry
 (1973) The Dance of Life, part 08 —Poetry
 (1973) The Dance of Life, part 09 —Poetry
 (1973) The Dance of Life, part 10 —Poetry
 (1973) The Dance of Life, part 11 —Poetry
 (1973) The Dance of Life, part 12 —Poetry
 (1973) The Dance of Life, part 13 —Poetry
 (1973) The Dance of Life, part 14 —Poetry
 (1973) The Dance of Life, part 15 —Poetry
 (1973) The Dance of Life, part 16 —Poetry
 (1973) The Dance of Life, part 17 —Poetry
 (1973) The Dance of Life, part 18 —Poetry
 (1973) The Dance of Life, part 19 —Poetry
 (1973) The Dance of Life, part 20 —Poetry
 (1973) The Ascent and Descent of the Disciples —Short stories
 (1973) God's Orchestra, A-Z, Compilation —Commentary
 (1973) Kundalini: The Mother-Power —Lectures
 (1973) Entertainment Versus Enlightenment —Short stories
 (1973) Something, Somehow, Somewhere, Someday —Poetry
 (1973) You —Aphorisms
 (1973) Rainbow-Flowers, part 1  —Commentary
 (1973) The Garden of Love-Light, part 1 —Songs
 (1973) The Garden of Love-Light, part 2 —Songs
 (1973) Kennedy: The Universal Heart —Tributes
 (1973) My Salutation to Japan —Discourses; Poetry
 (1973) The Silence of Death —Poetry
 (1973) America in Her Depths —Discourses; Poetry
 (1973) Astrology, the Supernatural and the Beyond —Answers
 (1973) Death and Reincarnation —Discourses
 (1973) Promised Light from the Beyond —Lectures; Answers; Poetry
 (1973) Animal Kingdom —Poetry; Commentary
 (1973) Flame-Goal. Daily meditations —Aphorisms
 (1973) Colour Kingdom —Commentary; Aphorisms
 (1973) Try, You Too Can Laugh —Short stories
 (1974) Beyond Within —Discourses; Answers
 (1974) My Maple Tree —Lectures
 (1974) My Rose Petals, part 2 —Lectures
 (1974) Sri Chinmoy Primer —Answers
 (1974) The Master Surrenders —Short stories
 (1974) The Wings of Light, part 01 —Poetry
 (1974) The Wings of Light, part 02 —Poetry
 (1974) The Wings of Light, part 03 —Poetry
 (1974) The Wings of Light, part 04 —Poetry
 (1974) The Wings of Light, part 05 —Poetry
 (1974) The Wings of Light, part 06 —Poetry
 (1974) The Wings of Light, part 07 —Poetry
 (1974) The Wings of Light, part 08 —Poetry
 (1974) The Wings of Light, part 09 —Poetry
 (1974) The Wings of Light, part 10 —Poetry
 (1974) The Wings of Light, part 11 —Poetry
 (1974) The Wings of Light, part 12 —Poetry
 (1974) The Wings of Light, part 13 —Poetry
 (1974) The Wings of Light, part 14 —Poetry
 (1974) The Wings of Light, part 15 —Poetry
 (1974) The Wings of Light, part 16 —Poetry
 (1974) The Wings of Light, part 17 —Poetry
 (1974) The Wings of Light, part 18 —Poetry
 (1974) The Wings of Light, part 19 —Poetry
 (1974) The Wings of Light, part 20 —Poetry
 (1974) The Goal Is Won —Poetry
 (1974) Why the Masters Don't Mix —Short stories
 (1974) Fifty Freedom-Boats to One Golden Shore, part 1 —Lectures
 (1974) Fifty Freedom-Boats to One Golden Shore, part 2 —Lectures
 (1974) Fifty Freedom-Boats to One Golden Shore, part 3 —Lectures
 (1974) Fifty Freedom-Boats to One Golden Shore, part 4 —Lectures
 (1974) Three Hundred Sixty-Five Father's Day Prayers —Poetry
 (1974) One Lives, One Dies —Short stories
 (1974) Supreme, I Sing Only For You —Songs
 (1974) Europe-Blossoms —Poetry
 (1974) My California Redwoods —Poetry
 (1974) The Inner Promise: Paths to Self-Perfection —Lectures; Poetry
 (1974) Matsyendranath and Gorakshanath: Two Spiritual Lions —Plays
 (1974) God's New Philosophy —Short stories
 (1974) The Body, Humanity's Fortress —Answers
 (1974) Gopal's Eternal Brother and Other Stories for Children —Short stories
 (1974) Perfection-World —Answers
 (1974) Fortune-Philosophy —Aphorisms
 (1974) The Ambition-Deer —Short stories
 (1974) Life-Enquiry and Self-Discovery —Answers
 (1974) Earth's Cry Meets Heaven's Smile, part 1 —Answers
 (1974) Earth's Cry Meets Heaven's Smile, part 2 —Answers
 (1974) Gratitude-Sky and Ingratitude-Sea —Short stories
 (1974) The Tears of Nation-Hearts —Talks
 (1974) The Summits of God-Life: Samadhi and Siddhi —Discourses; Answers
 (1974) Lightless Soldiers Fail —Short stories
 (1974) Mind-Confusion and Heart-Illumination, part 1 —Answers
 (1974) Mind-Confusion and Heart-Illumination, part 2 —Answers
 (1974) A Yogi's Justice, an Avatar's Justice and God's Justice —Short stories
 (1974) A Galaxy of Beauty's Stars  —Answers
 (1974) Illumination-Fruits —Commentary
 (1974) The Journey of Silver Dreams —Answers
 (1974) Earth's Dream-Boat Sails —Answers
 (1974) Supreme, Teach Me How to Cry —Songs
 (1974) Art's Life and the Soul's Light —Discourses; Answers
 (1974) Aspiration-Plants —Discourses
 (1974)  A Hundred Years From Now  —Discourses
 (1974) My Rose Petals, part 3 —Lectures
 (1974) Canada Aspires, Canada Receives, Canada Achieves, part 1 —Answers
 (1974) Canada Aspires, Canada Receives, Canada Achieves, part 2 —Answers
 (1974) Life-Tree Leaves —Discourses
 (1974) Purity-River Wins —Answers
 (1974) Aspiration-Flames —Answers
 (1974) Purity: Divinity's Little Sister —Answers
 (1974) Cry Within, Yours Is the Goal —Discourses
 (1974) My Rose Petals, part 4 —Lectures
 (1974) Is God Really Partial? —Short stories
 (1974) Eternity's Soul-Bird, part 1 —Answers
 (1974) Eternity's Soul-Bird, part 2 —Answers
 (1974) I Am Telling You a Great Secret: You Are a Fantastic Dream of God —Conversations
 (1974) Prayer-World, Mantra-World and Japa-World —Answers
 (1974)  God the Supreme Musician —Discourses
 (1974) Realisation-Soul and Manifestation-Goal —Answers
 (1974) The Astral Journey —Short stories
 (1974)  Meditation: Man's Choice and God's Voice, part 1  —Answers
 (1974)  Meditation: Man's Choice and God's Voice, part 2  —Answers
 (1974) Meditation: Humanity's Race and Divinity's Grace, part 1 —Answers
 (1974) Meditation: Humanity's Race and Divinity's Grace, part 2 —Answers
 (1974) The Dance of the Cosmic Gods —Discourses
 (1974) Surrender's Unlimited Power —Discourses
 (1974) God the Supreme Humourist, part 1 —Answers; Poetry
 (1974) Problems! Problems! Are They Really Problems? Part 1 —Answers
 (1974) Problems! Problems! Are They Really Problems? Part 2 —Answers
 (1974) A God-Lover's Earth-Heaven-Life, part 1 —Answers
 (1974) My Self-Giving Is My God-Becoming —Answers
 (1974) A Galaxy of Saints —Short stories
 (1974) At the Doors of Time and Delight Opportunity Knocks —Answers
 (1974) Consciousness: God-Journey to Man, Man-Journey to God —Answers
 (1974) God-Life: Is It a Far Cry? —Answers
 (1974) The Height of Silence and the Might of Sound —Discourses; Answers
 (1974) The Hunger of Darkness and the Feast of Light, part 1 —Answers
 (1974) The Hunger of Darkness and the Feast of Light, part 2 —Answers
 (1974) The Illumination of Life-Clouds, part 1 —Answers
 (1974) The Illumination of Life-Clouds, part 2 —Answers
 (1974) The Master's Self-Appointed Emissary —Short stories
 (1974) Meditation: God Speaks and I Listen, part 1 —Answers
 (1974) Meditation: God Speaks and I Listen, part 2 —Answers
 (1974) Meditation: God's Blessing-Assurance —Answers
 (1974) Meditation: God's Duty and Man's Beauty —Answers
 (1974) Service-Boat and Love-Boatman, part 1  —Answers
 (1974) Service-Boat and Love-Boatman, part 2  —Answers
 (1974) Sleep: Death's Little Sister —Answers; Poetry
 (1974)  Three Strangling Sisters: Fear, Jealousy and Insecurity  —Discourses
 (1974) Two Devouring Brothers: Doubt and Ego —Answers
 (1974) The Vision of God's Dawn —Discourses 
 (1974)  Light-Delight-Journeys  —Poetry; Commentary
 (1974) My Canadian Fruits —Poetry
 (1974) Immortality's Dance —Poetry
 (1974) Giving and Becoming —Poetry
 (1974) Eternity's Silence-Heart  —Poetry
 (1974) The Prayer of the Sky —Poetry
 (1974) God's Vision-Promise —Poetry
 (1975) Transformation-Night. Immortality's Dawn —Answers
 (1975) The Silence-Song —Poetry
 (1975) Lord, Receive This Little Undying Cry —Poetry
 (1975) Lord, I Ask You for One Favour —Poetry
 (1975) I Need Only God —Poetry
 (1975) God-Journey's Perfection-Return —Answers
 (1975) When God-Love Descends —Poetry
 (1975) Lord, I Need You —Poetry
 (1975) Fourteen American Mothers and Fourteen American Daughters with Sri Chinmoy —Talks; Answers
 (1975) Flame-Waves, part 01 —Answers
 (1975) Flame-Waves, part 02 —Answers
 (1975) Flame-Waves, part 03 —Answers
 (1975) Flame-Waves, part 04 —Answers
 (1975) Flame-Waves, part 05 —Answers
 (1975) My Life-Tree —Poetry
 (1975) My Promise to God —Poetry
 (1975) When I Left God in Heaven  —Poetry
 (1975) Beauty-Drops —Poetry; Commentary
 (1975) Yesterday I Was a Crying Dream —Poetry
 (1975) Dreams That Fly —Poetry
 (1975) Fifty Freedom-Boats to One Golden Shore, part 5 —Lectures
 (1975) Fifty Freedom-Boats to One Golden Shore, part 6 —Lectures
 (1975) Earth-Bound Journey and Heaven-Bound Journey —Lectures
 (1975) This Is God's Home —Poetry
 (1975) Brother Jesus —Poetry
 (1975) The Sacred Fire —Plays
 (1975) Supreme, Teach Me How to Surrender —Songs
 (1975) I Need My Country: Beauty's Soul —Poetry
 (1975) Sound Becomes, Silence Is —Poetry
 (1975) I Love My Country: Purity's Body —Discourses
 (1975) Love-Power and Gratitude-Flower —Short stories
 (1975) Supreme, Make My Life a Gratitude-Flood —Songs
 (1975) Transcendence-Perfection —Poetry
 (1975) Pole-Star Promise-Light, part 1 —Songs
 (1975) Pole-Star Promise-Light, part 2 —Songs
 (1975) Pole-Star Promise-Light, part 3 —Songs
 (1975) Pole-Star Promise-Light, part 4 —Songs
 (1975) Silence-Seed and Sound-Fruit —Poetry; Commentary
 (1975)  God-Compassion and God-Justice —Poetry
 (1975) Dependence and Assurance —Discourses
 (1975) The Garden of Love-Light, part 3 —Songs
 (1976) Two Divine Instruments: Master and Disciple —Discourses
 (1976) Surrender and Realisation —Talks
 (1976) The Inner Hunger —Discourses
 (1976) Union and Oneness —Poetry; Commentary
 (1976) Dedication-Drops —Poetry
 (1976) A Lost Friend —Short stories
 (1976) The Soul's Journey —Discourses
 (1976) Disciples' Love-Power —Short stories
 (1976) Illumination-Song and Liberation-Dance, part 1 —Songs
 (1976) Illumination-Song and Liberation-Dance, part 2 —Songs
 (1976) I Shall Forgive My Past Songbook —Songs
 (1976) The Bicentennial Flames at the UN —Answers
 (1976) Compassion-Father, Champion-Brother, Perfection-Friend —Tributes
 (1976) The Liberty Torch —Aphorisms
 (1976) They Came Only to Go. The birthless and deathless chronicles of Himalayan absurdity —Short stories (autobiographical)
 (1976) A God-Lover's Earth-Heaven-Life, part 2 —Answers
 (1976) A God-Lover's Earth-Heaven-Life, part 3 —Answers
 (1976) Spiritual Power, Occult Power and Will Power; Washington Lecture Series, part 1 —Lectures
 (1976) My Heart's Salutation to Australia, part 1 —Lectures; Answers
 (1976) Sri Chinmoy Speaks, part 01 —Lectures
 (1976) Nineteen American Mothers and Nineteen American Sons with Sri Chinmoy —Talks; Answers
 (1976) My Heart's Salutation to Australia, part 2 —Lectures; Answers
 (1976) Sri Chinmoy Speaks, part 02 —Lectures
 (1976) Sri Chinmoy Speaks, part 03 —Lectures
 (1976) Self-Discovery and World-Mastery —Lectures; Answers
 (1976) Illumination-Song and Liberation-Dance, part 3 —Songs (Bengali with translations)
 (1976) Sri Chinmoy Speaks, part 04 —Lectures; Answers
 (1976) Sri Chinmoy Speaks, part 05 —Talks; Answers
 (1976) Sri Chinmoy Speaks, part 06 —Talks; Answers
 (1976) Father's Day: Father with His European Children —Answers
 (1976) My Rose Petals, part 5 —Lectures; Answers
 (1976) Creation and Perfection —Talks; Answers
 (1976) My Rose Petals, part 6 —Lectures
 (1976) My Rose Petals, part 7 —Lectures
 (1976) Dipti Nivas  —Answers
 (1976) Soulful Questions and Fruitful Answers —Answers
 (1976) Warriors of the Inner World —Lectures
 (1976) Flame-Waves, part 06 —Answers
 (1976) Flame-Waves, part 07 —Answers
 (1976) Flame-Waves, part 08 —Answers
 (1976) Union-Vision —Talks
 (1976) Justice-Light and Satisfaction-Delight —Answers
 (1976) Reality-Dream —Talks
 (1976) Perseverance and Aspiration —Talks
 (1976) Sri Chinmoy Speaks, part 10 —Lectures; Answers
 (1976) Aspiration-Tree —Answers
 (1977) Conversations with the Master —Answers
 (1977) Illumination-World —Talks; Answers
 (1977) U Thant: Divinity's Smile, Humanity's Cry —Talks; Interviews; Songs
 (1977) God and the Cosmic Game —Answers
 (1977) My Green Adoration-Gifts, part 1 —Songs (Bengali with translations)
 (1977) My Green Adoration-Gifts, part 2 —Songs (Bengali with translations)
 (1977) India and Her Miracle-Feast: Come and Enjoy Yourself. Part 1 - Traditional Stories about Troilanga Swami  —Short stories
 (1977) India and Her Miracle-Feast: Come and Enjoy Yourself. Part 2 - Traditional Stories about Shyama Charan Lahiri —Short stories
 (1977) India and Her Miracle-Feast: Come and Enjoy Yourself. Part 3 - Traditional Stories about Gambhirananda —Short stories
 (1977) India and Her Miracle-Feast: Come and Enjoy Yourself. Part 4 - Traditional Stories about Bhaskarananda —Short stories
 (1977) The Meditation-World —Discourses; Answers
 (1977) India and Her Miracle-Feast: Come and Enjoy Yourself. Part 5 - Traditional Stories about Devadas Maharaj —Short stories
 (1977) India and Her Miracle-Feast: Come and Enjoy Yourself. Part 6 vol. 1 - Traditional Stories about Ramdas Kathiya Baba —Short stories
 (1977) India and Her Miracle-Feast: Come and Enjoy Yourself. Part 6 vol. 2 - Traditional Stories about Ramdas Kathiya Baba —Short stories
 (1977) The Soul and the Process of Reincarnation —Answers
 (1977) The Doubt-World —Discourses
 (1977) Selfless Service-Light —Answers
 (1977) The Significance of a Smile —Answers
 (1977) Obedience: A Supreme Virtue —Discourses; Answers
 (1977) Occultism and Mysticism —Answers
 (1977) God, Avatars and Yogis —Answers
 (1977) Experiences of the Higher Worlds —Answers
 (1977) Perfection and Transcendence —Discourses; Answers
 (1977) Transformation of the Ego —Answers
 (1977) Inner Progress and Satisfaction-Life —Discourses; Answers
 (1977) Miracles, Emanations and Dreams —Discourses; Answers
 (1977) Obedience or Oneness —Discourses; Answers
 (1977) Opportunity and Self-Transcendence —Discourses; Answers
 (1977) The Inner Journey —Answers
 (1977) Palmistry, Reincarnation and the Dream State —Discourses; Answers
 (1977) Inspiration-Garden and Aspiration-Leaves —Discourses; Answers
 (1977) Four Intimate Friends: Insincerity, Impurity, Doubt and Self-Indulgence —Answers
 (1977) Ego and Self-Complacency —Answers
 (1977) Politics and Spirituality: Can They Go Together? —Answers
 (1977) The Silent Mind —Talks
 (1977) The Spiritual Journey: Oneness in Diversity —Answers
 (1977) Aspiration-Glow and Dedication-Flow, part 1 —Answers
 (1977) Aspiration-Glow and Dedication-Flow, part 2 —Answers
 (1977) A Twentieth Century Seeker —Discourses; Answers
 (1977) Soul-Education for the Family-World —Answers
 (1977) Reincarnation and Evolution —Answers
 (1977) The Hour of Meditation —Answers
 (1977) The Master's Inner Life —Discourses; Answers
 (1977) Great Masters and the Cosmic Gods —Answers
 (1977) The Soul's Evolution —Lectures; Answers
 (1977) Aspiration and God's Hour —Answers
 (1977) Transcendence of the Past —Answers
 (1977) The Mind and the Heart in Meditation —Answers
 (1977) God the Supreme Humourist, part 2 —Answers
 (1977) A Soulful Cry Versus a Fruitful Smile —Poetry (rhyming)
 (1977) Smile of the Beyond —Answers
 (1977) Everest-Aspiration, part 1 —Discourses; Lectures
 (1977) Everest-Aspiration, part 2 —Discourses; Lectures
 (1977) Everest-Aspiration, part 3 —Discourses; Lectures
 (1977) Everest-Aspiration, part 4 —Discourses; Lectures
 (1978) Journey's Goal Songbook, part 01 —Songs (English)
 (1978) Journey's Goal Songbook, part 02 —Songs (English)
 (1978) From the Source to the Source —Poetry (rhyming)
 (1978) Illumination-Song and Liberation-Dance, part 6 - Songbook —Songs (Bengali)
 (1978) Freedom-Heights, part 1 —Songs (Bengali)
 (1978) Patience-Groves, songbook —Songs (Bengali with translations)
 (1978) Journey's Goal Songbook, part 03 —Songs (Bengali)
 (1978) Journey's Goal Songbook, part 04 —Songs (Bengali)
 (1978) Journey's Goal Songbook, part 05 —Songs (Bengali)
 (1977) Two God-Servers and Man-Lovers Parts 1 & 2 —Tributes
 (1978) A Soulful Tribute to the Secretary-General: the Pilot Supreme of the UN —Tributes
 (1978) Bela Chale Jai —Songs (Bengali with translations)
 (1978) The Seeker's Mind —Talks
 (1978) United Nations Meditation-Flowers and To-morrow's Noon —Talks; Discourses; Poetry
 (1978) Flame-Waves, part 09 —Answers
 (1978) Flame-Waves, part 10 —Answers
 (1978) Flame-Waves, part 11 —Answers
 (1978) Flame-Waves, part 12 —Answers
 (1979) Einstein: Scientist-Sage, Brother of Atom-Universe —Discourses; Poetry; Songs
 (1979) Great Indian Meals: Divinely Delicious and Supremely Nourishing, part 01 —Short stories
 (1979) Great Indian Meals: Divinely Delicious and Supremely Nourishing, part 02 —Short stories
 (1979) Great Indian Meals: Divinely Delicious and Supremely Nourishing, part 03 —Short stories
 (1979) Great Indian Meals: Divinely Delicious and Supremely Nourishing, part 04 —Short stories
 (1979) Run and Become. Become and Run, part 01 —Short stories (autobiographical)
 (1979) The Heart-Home of the Immortals —Songs (English)
 (1979) The Avatars and Masters —Answers
 (1979) Great Indian Meals: Divinely Delicious and Supremely Nourishing, part 05 —Short stories
 (1979) Great Indian Meals: Divinely Delicious and Supremely Nourishing, part 06 —Short stories
 (1979) Great Indian Meals: Divinely Delicious and Supremely Nourishing, part 07 —Short stories
 (1979) Great Indian Meals: Divinely Delicious and Supremely Nourishing, part 08 —Short stories
 (1979) Great Indian Meals: Divinely Delicious and Supremely Nourishing, part 09 —Short stories
 (1979) Ten Thousand Flower-Flames, part 001 —Aphorisms
 (1979) Ten Thousand Flower-Flames, part 002 —Aphorisms
 (1979) Ten Thousand Flower-Flames, part 003 —Aphorisms
 (1979) Ten Thousand Flower-Flames, part 004 —Aphorisms
 (1979) Ten Thousand Flower-Flames, part 005 —Aphorisms
 (1979) Wisdom-Waves in New-York, part 1 —Lectures
 (1979) Wisdom-Waves in New-York, part 2 —Lectures
 (1979) Run and Become. Become and Run, part 02 —Short stories (autobiographical)
 (1979) Three Soulful Prayers —Poetry
 (1979) You and I Are God —Poetry
 (1979) Perfection in the Head-World —Talks; Answers
 (1979) The Jewel of Humility —Answers
 (1978) Service-Heroes —Answers
 (1979) Four Hundred Gratitude-Flower-Hearts —Poetry; Talks; Aphorisms; Commentary
 (1979) Blue Waves of the Ocean-Source —Songs
 (1979) Philosophy, Religion and Yoga —Answers
 (1979) The Disciples' Freedom —Answers
 (1980) Secrets of the Inner World —Discourses; Answers
 (1980) O My Pilot Beloved —Prayers
 (1980) The Vision-Sky of California —Lectures
 (1980) Mother-Land, Father-Land, I Love You —Songs (Bengali with translations)
 (1980) Emil Zatopek: Earth's Tearing Cry, Heaven's Beaming Smile —Tributes
 (1980) Run and Become. Become and Run, part 03 —Short stories (autobiographical)
 (1980) I Know Not Why —Songs (Bengali with translations)
 (1980) Ten Thousand Flower-Flames, part 006 —Aphorisms
 (1980) Earth's Cry Meets Heaven's Smile, part 3 —Answers
 (1980) Fountain-Art Song-Garland —Songs (Bengali with translations)
 (1980) Ten Thousand Flower-Flames, part 007 —Aphorisms
 (1981) Ten Thousand Flower-Flames, part 008 —Aphorisms
 (1981) Ten Thousand Flower-Flames, part 009 —Aphorisms
 (1981) Ten Thousand Flower-Flames, part 010 —Aphorisms
 (1981) Ten Thousand Flower-Flames, part 011 —Aphorisms
 (1981) Ten Thousand Flower-Flames, part 012 —Aphorisms
 (1981) Ten Thousand Flower-Flames, part 013 —Aphorisms
 (1981) Ten Thousand Flower-Flames, part 014 —Aphorisms
 (1981) Ten Thousand Flower-Flames, part 015 —Aphorisms
 (1981) Ten Thousand Flower-Flames, part 016 —Aphorisms
 (1981) Journey's Goal Songbook, part 06 —Songs (English)
 (1981) Journey's Goal Songbook, part 07a —Songs (English)
 (1981) Journey's Goal Songbook, part 07b —Songs (English)
 (1981) Journey's Goal Songbook, part 08a —Songs (English)
 (1981) Journey's Goal Songbook, part 08b —Songs (English)
 (1981) Journey's Goal Songbook, part 09a —Songs (English)
 (1981) The Loser and the Winner —Poetry
 (1981) Ten Thousand Flower-Flames, part 017 —Aphorisms
 (1981) Ten Thousand Flower-Flames, part 018 —Aphorisms
 (1981) Journey's Goal Songbook, part 09b —Songs (Bengali)
 (1981) Journey's Goal Songbook, part 10a —Songs (Bengali)
 (1981) Journey's Goal Songbook, part 10b —Songs (Bengali)
 (1981) Journey's Goal Songbook, part 11a —Songs (Bengali)
 (1981) Journey's Goal Songbook, part 11b —Songs (Bengali)
 (1981) Journey's Goal Songbook, part 12a —Songs (Bengali)
 (1981) Journey's Goal Songbook, part 12b —Songs (Bengali)
 (1981) Journey's Goal Songbook, part 13 —Songs (Bengali)
 (1981) Run and Become. Become and Run, part 04 —Short stories (autobiographical)
 (1981) Chandelier, part 1 —Songs
 (1981) Chandelier, part 2 —Songs
 (1981) Illumination-Song and Liberation-Dance, part 7 - Songbook —Songs (Bengali with translations)
 (1981) Illumination-Song and Liberation-Dance, part 8 - Songbook —Songs (Bengali with translations)
 (1981) My Fifty Gratitude-Summers —Poetry
 (1981) Ten Thousand Flower-Flames, part 019 —Aphorisms
 (1981) Ten Thousand Flower-Flames, part 020 —Aphorisms
 (1981) Salutations, Numbers 1 - 4 —Short stories (autobiographical)
 (1981) Salutations, Numbers 5 - 8 —Short stories (autobiographical)
 (1981) Run and Become. Become and Run, part 05 —Short stories (autobiographical)
 (1981) Flame-Roads —Songs (Bengali with translations)
 (1981) Ten Thousand Flower-Flames, part 021 —Aphorisms
 (1981) The Sailor and the Parrot —Short stories
 (1981) India and Her Miracle-Feast: Come and Enjoy Yourself. Part 7 - Traditional Stories about Swami Nigamananda —Short stories
 (1981) India and Her Miracle-Feast: Come and Enjoy Yourself. Part 8 - Traditional Stories about Bama Kshepa —Short stories
 (1981) India and Her Miracle-Feast: Come and Enjoy Yourself. Part 9 - Traditional Stories about Balananda —Short stories
 (1981) The Mushroom and the Umbrella —Short stories
 (1981) Big Pot, Little Pot —Short stories
 (1981) Two Brothers: Madal and Chinmoy, part 1 —Conversations
 (1981) Ten Thousand Flower-Flames, part 022 —Aphorisms
 (1981) Run and Become. Become and Run, part 06 —Short stories (autobiographical)
 (1981) Is Your Mind Ready to Cry? Is Your Heart Ready to Smile? Part 01 —Short stories
 (1982) Run and Become. Become and Run, part 07 —Short stories (autobiographical)
 (1982) Is Your Mind Ready to Cry? Is Your Heart Ready to Smile? Part 02 —Short stories
 (1982) Is Your Mind Ready to Cry? Is Your Heart Ready to Smile? Part 03 —Short stories
 (1982) Is Your Mind Ready to Cry? Is Your Heart Ready to Smile? Part 04 —Short stories
 (1982) Is Your Mind Ready to Cry? Is Your Heart Ready to Smile? Part 05 —Short stories
 (1982) Is Your Mind Ready to Cry? Is Your Heart Ready to Smile? Part 06 —Short stories
 (1982) Is Your Mind Ready to Cry? Is Your Heart Ready to Smile? Part 07 —Short stories
 (1982) Is Your Mind Ready to Cry? Is Your Heart Ready to Smile? Part 08 —Short stories
 (1982) Is Your Mind Ready to Cry? Is Your Heart Ready to Smile? Part 09 —Short stories
 (1982) Is Your Mind Ready to Cry? Is Your Heart Ready to Smile? Part 10 —Short stories
 (1982) Great Indian Meals: Divinely Delicious and Supremely Nourishing, part 10 —Short stories
 (1982) Ten Thousand Flower-Flames, part 023 —Aphorisms
 (1982) Ten Thousand Flower-Flames, part 024 —Aphorisms
 (1982) Ten Thousand Flower-Flames, part 025 —Aphorisms
 (1982) Ten Thousand Flower-Flames, part 026 —Aphorisms
 (1982) Ten Thousand Flower-Flames, part 027 —Aphorisms
 (1982) Ten Thousand Flower-Flames, part 028 —Aphorisms
 (1982) Ten Thousand Flower-Flames, part 029 —Aphorisms
 (1982) Ten Thousand Flower-Flames, part 030 —Aphorisms
 (1982) Ten Thousand Flower-Flames, part 031 —Aphorisms
 (1982) Two Brothers: Madal and Chinmoy, part 2 —Conversations
 (1982) Two Brothers: Madal and Chinmoy, part 3 —Conversations
 (1982) Ten Thousand Flower-Flames, part 032 —Aphorisms
 (1982) Run and Become. Become and Run, part 08 —Short stories (autobiographical)
 (1982) Aurora-Flora —Poetry
 (1982) What I Need from God —Lectures
 (1982) Prayer-Plants —Prayers
 (1982) Tomorrow's Dawn —Aphorisms; Poetry
 (1982) Climbing Flames —Songs
 (1982) Run and Become. Become and Run, Songbook —Songs
 (1982) Illumination-Experiences on Indian Soil, part 1 —Short stories
 (1982) Illumination-Experiences on Indian Soil, part 2 —Short stories
 (1982) Illumination-Experiences on Indian Soil, part 3 —Short stories
 (1982) Ten Thousand Flower-Flames, part 033 —Aphorisms
 (1982) Sound and Silence, part 1 —Lectures; Answers
 (1982) Sound and Silence, part 2 —Lectures; Answers
 (1982) I Am Ready —Poetry
 (1982) Ten Thousand Flower-Flames, part 033 —Aphorisms
 (1982) Ten Thousand Flower-Flames, part 034 —Aphorisms
 (1982) Ten Thousand Flower-Flames, part 035 —Aphorisms
 (1982) Ten Thousand Flower-Flames, part 036 —Aphorisms
 (1982) Ten Thousand Flower-Flames, part 037 —Aphorisms
 (1982) Ten Thousand Flower-Flames, part 038 —Aphorisms
 (1982) Ten Thousand Flower-Flames, part 039 —Aphorisms
 (1982) Ten Thousand Flower-Flames, part 040 —Aphorisms
 (1982) Ten Thousand Flower-Flames, part 041 —Aphorisms
 (1982) Ten Thousand Flower-Flames, part 042 —Aphorisms
 (1982) Ten Thousand Flower-Flames, part 043 —Aphorisms
 (1982) Ten Thousand Flower-Flames, part 044 —Aphorisms
 (1982) Ten Thousand Flower-Flames, part 045 —Aphorisms
 (1982) I Meditate So That —Poetry
 (1982) Ten Thousand Flower-Flames, part 046 —Aphorisms
 (1982) Ten Thousand Flower-Flames, part 047 —Aphorisms
 (1982) Ten Thousand Flower-Flames, part 048 —Aphorisms
 (1983) Run and Become. Become and Run, part 09 —Short stories (autobiographical)
 (1983) Ten Thousand Flower-Flames, part 049 —Aphorisms
 (1983) Ten Thousand Flower-Flames, part 050 —Aphorisms
 (1983) My Heart's Thirty-One Sacred Secrets —Poetry; Aphorisms
 (1983) Ten Thousand Flower-Flames, part 051 —Aphorisms
 (1983) Ten Thousand Flower-Flames, part 052 —Aphorisms
 (1983) Run and Become. Become and Run, part 10 —Short stories (autobiographical)
 (1983) Ten Thousand Flower-Flames, part 053 —Aphorisms
 (1983) Ten Thousand Flower-Flames, part 054 —Aphorisms
 (1983) Ten Thousand Flower-Flames, part 055 —Aphorisms
 (1983) Ten Thousand Flower-Flames, part 056 —Aphorisms
 (1983) Ten Thousand Flower-Flames, part 057 —Aphorisms
 (1983) Ten Thousand Flower-Flames, part 058 —Aphorisms
 (1983) Ten Thousand Flower-Flames, part 059 —Aphorisms
 (1983) Ten Thousand Flower-Flames, part 060 —Aphorisms
 (1983) Ten Thousand Flower-Flames, part 061 —Aphorisms
 (1983) Ten Thousand Flower-Flames, part 062 —Aphorisms
 (1983) Ten Thousand Flower-Flames, part 063 —Aphorisms
 (1983) Ten Thousand Flower-Flames, part 064 —Aphorisms
 (1983) Ten Thousand Flower-Flames, part 065 —Aphorisms
 (1983) Ten Thousand Flower-Flames, part 066 —Aphorisms
 (1983) Ten Thousand Flower-Flames, part 067 —Aphorisms
 (1983) Ten Thousand Flower-Flames, part 068 —Aphorisms
 (1983) Ten Thousand Flower-Flames, part 069 —Aphorisms
 (1983) Ten Thousand Flower-Flames, part 070 —Aphorisms
 (1983) Consciousness-Sky Songbook —Songs
 (1983) To-morrow's Shore —Songs (Bengali with translations)
 (1983) Satisfaction-Blossoms Songbook —Songs (Bengali)
 (1983) Ten Thousand Flower-Flames, part 071 —Aphorisms
 (1983) Ten Thousand Flower-Flames, part 072 —Aphorisms
 (1983) Ten Thousand Flower-Flames, part 073 —Aphorisms
 (1983) Ten Thousand Flower-Flames, part 074 —Aphorisms
 (1983) Ten Thousand Flower-Flames, part 075 —Aphorisms
 (1983) Ten Thousand Flower-Flames, part 076 —Aphorisms
 (1983) Ten Thousand Flower-Flames, part 077 —Aphorisms
 (1983) Ten Thousand Flower-Flames, part 078 —Aphorisms
 (1983) Ten Thousand Flower-Flames, part 080 —Aphorisms
 (1983) Ten Thousand Flower-Flames, part 082 —Aphorisms
 (1983) Ten Thousand Flower-Flames, part 083 —Aphorisms
 (1983) Ten Thousand Flower-Flames, part 084 —Aphorisms
 (1983) Ten Thousand Flower-Flames, part 085 —Aphorisms
 (1983) Ten Thousand Flower-Flames, part 086 —Aphorisms
 (1983) Ten Thousand Flower-Flames, part 087 —Aphorisms
 (1983) Ten Thousand Flower-Flames, part 088 —Aphorisms
 (1983) Ten Thousand Flower-Flames, part 089 —Aphorisms
 (1983) Ten Thousand Flower-Flames, part 090 —Aphorisms
 (1983) Ten Thousand Flower-Flames, part 091 —Aphorisms
 (1983) Ten Thousand Flower-Flames, part 092 —Aphorisms
 (1983) Ten Thousand Flower-Flames, part 093 —Aphorisms
 (1983) Sri Chinmoy with His Himalayan Champion-Coach: Payton Jordan —Interviews
 (1983) Ten Thousand Flower-Flames, part 094 —Aphorisms
 (1983) Ten Thousand Flower-Flames, part 095 —Aphorisms
 (1983) Ten Thousand Flower-Flames, part 096 —Aphorisms
 (1983) Ten Thousand Flower-Flames, part 097 —Aphorisms
 (1983) Ten Thousand Flower-Flames, part 098 —Aphorisms
 (1983) Ten Thousand Flower-Flames, part 099 —Aphorisms
 (1983) Ten Thousand Flower-Flames, part 100 —Aphorisms
 (1983) Twenty-Seven Thousand Aspiration-Plants, part 001 —Aphorisms
 (1983) Twenty-Seven Thousand Aspiration-Plants, part 002 —Aphorisms
 (1983) Twenty-Seven Thousand Aspiration-Plants, part 003 —Aphorisms
 (1983) Twenty-Seven Thousand Aspiration-Plants, part 004 —Aphorisms
 (1983) Twenty-Seven Thousand Aspiration-Plants, part 005 —Aphorisms
 (1983) Twenty-Seven Thousand Aspiration-Plants, part 006 —Aphorisms
 (1983) Twenty-Seven Thousand Aspiration-Plants, part 007 —Aphorisms
 (1983) Twenty-Seven Thousand Aspiration-Plants, part 008 —Aphorisms
 (1983) Twenty-Seven Thousand Aspiration-Plants, part 009 —Aphorisms
 (1983) Twenty-Seven Thousand Aspiration-Plants, part 010 —Aphorisms
 (1983) Twenty-Seven Thousand Aspiration-Plants, part 011 —Aphorisms
 (1983) Twenty-Seven Thousand Aspiration-Plants, part 012 —Aphorisms
 (1983) Twenty-Seven Thousand Aspiration-Plants, part 013 —Aphorisms
 (1983) Twenty-Seven Thousand Aspiration-Plants, part 014 —Aphorisms
 (1983) Twenty-Seven Thousand Aspiration-Plants, part 015 —Aphorisms
 (1983) Twenty-Seven Thousand Aspiration-Plants, part 016 —Aphorisms
 (1983) Twenty-Seven Thousand Aspiration-Plants, part 017 —Aphorisms
 (1983) Twenty-Seven Thousand Aspiration-Plants, part 018 —Aphorisms
 (1983) Twenty-Seven Thousand Aspiration-Plants, part 019 —Aphorisms
 (1983) Twenty-Seven Thousand Aspiration-Plants, part 020 —Aphorisms
 (1983) Run and Become. Become and Run, part 11 —Short stories (autobiographical)
 (1983) Run and Become. Become and Run, part 12 —Short stories (autobiographical)
 (1983) Run and Become. Become and Run, part 13 —Short stories (autobiographical)
 (1983) The Songs of God-Souls —Songs (Bengali with translations)
 (1983) I Pray So That —Poetry
 (1984) Twenty-Seven Thousand Aspiration-Plants, part 021 —Aphorisms
 (1984) Twenty-Seven Thousand Aspiration-Plants, part 022 —Aphorisms
 (1984) Twenty-Seven Thousand Aspiration-Plants, part 023 —Aphorisms
 (1984) Twenty-Seven Thousand Aspiration-Plants, part 024 —Aphorisms
 (1984) Twenty-Seven Thousand Aspiration-Plants, part 025 —Aphorisms
 (1984) Twenty-Seven Thousand Aspiration-Plants, part 026 —Aphorisms
 (1984) Twenty-Seven Thousand Aspiration-Plants, part 027 —Aphorisms
 (1984) Twenty-Seven Thousand Aspiration-Plants, part 028 —Aphorisms
 (1984) Twenty-Seven Thousand Aspiration-Plants, part 029 —Aphorisms
 (1984) Twenty-Seven Thousand Aspiration-Plants, part 030 —Aphorisms
 (1984) Twenty-Seven Thousand Aspiration-Plants, part 031 —Aphorisms
 (1984) Twenty-Seven Thousand Aspiration-Plants, part 032 —Aphorisms
 (1984) Twenty-Seven Thousand Aspiration-Plants, part 033 —Aphorisms
 (1984) Twenty-Seven Thousand Aspiration-Plants, part 034 —Aphorisms
 (1984) Twenty-Seven Thousand Aspiration-Plants, part 035 —Aphorisms
 (1984) Twenty-Seven Thousand Aspiration-Plants, part 036 —Aphorisms
 (1984) Twenty-Seven Thousand Aspiration-Plants, part 037 —Aphorisms
 (1984) Twenty-Seven Thousand Aspiration-Plants, part 038 —Aphorisms
 (1984) Twenty-Seven Thousand Aspiration-Plants, part 039 —Aphorisms
 (1984) Twenty-Seven Thousand Aspiration-Plants, part 041 —Aphorisms
 (1984) Twenty-Seven Thousand Aspiration-Plants, part 042 —Aphorisms
 (1984) Twenty-Seven Thousand Aspiration-Plants, part 043 —Aphorisms
 (1984) Twenty-Seven Thousand Aspiration-Plants, part 044 —Aphorisms
 (1984) Twenty-Seven Thousand Aspiration-Plants, part 045 —Aphorisms
 (1984) Twenty-Seven Thousand Aspiration-Plants, part 046 —Aphorisms
 (1984) Twenty-Seven Thousand Aspiration-Plants, part 047 —Aphorisms
 (1984) Twenty-Seven Thousand Aspiration-Plants, part 048 —Aphorisms
 (1984) Twenty-Seven Thousand Aspiration-Plants, part 049 —Aphorisms
 (1984) Twenty-Seven Thousand Aspiration-Plants, part 050 —Aphorisms
 (1984) Twenty-Seven Thousand Aspiration-Plants, part 051 —Aphorisms
 (1984) Twenty-Seven Thousand Aspiration-Plants, part 052 —Aphorisms
 (1984) Twenty-Seven Thousand Aspiration-Plants, part 053 —Aphorisms
 (1984) Twenty-Seven Thousand Aspiration-Plants, part 054 —Aphorisms
 (1984) Twenty-Seven Thousand Aspiration-Plants, part 055 —Aphorisms
 (1984) Twenty-Seven Thousand Aspiration-Plants, part 056 —Aphorisms
 (1984) Twenty-Seven Thousand Aspiration-Plants, part 057 —Aphorisms
 (1984) Twenty-Seven Thousand Aspiration-Plants, part 058 —Aphorisms
 (1984) Never Say No —Songs (english with translations)
 (1984) Twenty-Seven Thousand Aspiration-Plants, part 059 —Aphorisms
 (1984) Twenty-Seven Thousand Aspiration-Plants, part 060 —Aphorisms
 (1984) Twenty-Seven Thousand Aspiration-Plants, part 061 —Aphorisms
 (1984) Twenty-Seven Thousand Aspiration-Plants, part 062 —Aphorisms
 (1984) Twenty-Seven Thousand Aspiration-Plants, part 063 —Aphorisms
 (1984) The Outer Running and the Inner Running —Discourses; Talks; Answers
 (1984) Twenty-Seven Thousand Aspiration-Plants, part 064 —Aphorisms
 (1984) Twenty-Seven Thousand Aspiration-Plants, part 065 —Aphorisms
 (1984) Twenty-Seven Thousand Aspiration-Plants, part 066 —Aphorisms
 (1984) Twenty-Seven Thousand Aspiration-Plants, part 067 —Aphorisms
 (1984) Twenty-Seven Thousand Aspiration-Plants, part 068 —Aphorisms
 (1984) Twenty-Seven Thousand Aspiration-Plants, part 069 —Aphorisms
 (1984) Twenty-Seven Thousand Aspiration-Plants, part 070 —Aphorisms
 (1984) Twenty-Seven Thousand Aspiration-Plants, part 071 —Aphorisms
 (1984) Twenty-Seven Thousand Aspiration-Plants, part 072 —Aphorisms
 (1984) Twenty-Seven Thousand Aspiration-Plants, part 073 —Aphorisms
 (1984) Twenty-Seven Thousand Aspiration-Plants, part 074 —Aphorisms
 (1984) Twenty-Seven Thousand Aspiration-Plants, part 075 —Aphorisms
 (1984) Twenty-Seven Thousand Aspiration-Plants, part 076 —Aphorisms
 (1984) Twenty-Seven Thousand Aspiration-Plants, part 077 —Aphorisms
 (1984) Twenty-Seven Thousand Aspiration-Plants, part 078 —Aphorisms
 (1984) Twenty-Seven Thousand Aspiration-Plants, part 079 —Aphorisms
 (1984) Journey's Ecstasy Songbook —Songs (Bengali with translations)
 (1984) Twenty-Seven Thousand Aspiration-Plants, part 080 —Aphorisms
 (1984) Twenty-Seven Thousand Aspiration-Plants, part 081 —Aphorisms
 (1984) Twenty-Seven Thousand Aspiration-Plants, part 082 —Aphorisms
 (1984) Twenty-Seven Thousand Aspiration-Plants, part 083 —Aphorisms
 (1984) Twenty-Seven Thousand Aspiration-Plants, part 084 —Aphorisms
 (1984) Twenty-Seven Thousand Aspiration-Plants, part 085 —Aphorisms
 (1984) Twenty-Seven Thousand Aspiration-Plants, part 086 —Aphorisms
 (1984) Twenty-Seven Thousand Aspiration-Plants, part 087 —Aphorisms
 (1984) Twenty-Seven Thousand Aspiration-Plants, part 088 —Aphorisms
 (1984) Twenty-Seven Thousand Aspiration-Plants, part 089 —Aphorisms
 (1984) Twenty-Seven Thousand Aspiration-Plants, part 090 —Aphorisms
 (1984) Nolini: Sri Aurobindo's Unparalleled Friend-Son-Disciple —Tributes
 (1984) Twenty-Seven Thousand Aspiration-Plants, part 091 —Aphorisms
 (1984) Twenty-Seven Thousand Aspiration-Plants, part 092 —Aphorisms
 (1984) Twenty-Seven Thousand Aspiration-Plants, part 093 —Aphorisms
 (1984) Twenty-Seven Thousand Aspiration-Plants, part 094 —Aphorisms
 (1984) Twenty-Seven Thousand Aspiration-Plants, part 095 —Aphorisms
 (1984) Twenty-Seven Thousand Aspiration-Plants, part 096 —Aphorisms
 (1984) Twenty-Seven Thousand Aspiration-Plants, part 097 —Aphorisms
 (1984) Twenty-Seven Thousand Aspiration-Plants, part 098 —Aphorisms
 (1984) Twenty-Seven Thousand Aspiration-Plants, part 099 —Aphorisms
 (1984) Twenty-Seven Thousand Aspiration-Plants, part 100 —Aphorisms
 (1985) Twenty-Seven Thousand Aspiration-Plants, part 101 —Aphorisms
 (1985) Run and Become. Become and Run, part 14 —Short stories (autobiographical)
 (1985) Run and Become. Become and Run, part 15 —Short stories (autobiographical)
 (1985) Run and Become. Become and Run, part 16 —Short stories (autobiographical)
 (1985) Twenty-Seven Thousand Aspiration-Plants, part 102 —Aphorisms
 (1985) Master and the Disciple —Talks
 (1985) Salutations, Numbers 9-12 —Short stories (autobiographical)
 (1985) Twenty-Seven Thousand Aspiration-Plants, part 103 —Aphorisms
 (1985) Soul-Illumination-Shrine, Body-Preparation-Temple, part 1 —Answers
 (1985) I Love Shopping, part 1 —Short stories (autobiographical)
 (1986) Run and Become. Become and Run, part 17 —Short stories (autobiographical)
 (1986) Japan, My Life Bows to Your Heart —Commentary
 (1986) The World-Experience-Tree-Climber, part 1 —Short stories (autobiographical)
 (1986) I Love Shopping, part 2 —Short stories (autobiographical)
 (1986) Twenty-Seven Thousand Aspiration-Plants, part 104 —Aphorisms
 (1986) My God-Hunger-Dreams —Poetry
 (1986) Twenty-Seven Thousand Aspiration-Plants, part 105 —Aphorisms
 (1986) Twenty-Seven Thousand Aspiration-Plants, part 106 —Aphorisms
 (1986) Body, Heart and Soul. One-Arm Lift Anniversary —Answers
 (1986) I Pray before I Lift, I Meditate While I Lift, I Offer My Gratitude-Cries and Gratitude-Smiles —Prayers
 (1986) My Weightlifting Tears and Smiles, part 1 —Short stories (autobiographical)
 (1986) My Weightlifting Tears and Smiles, part 2 —Short stories (autobiographical)
 (1987) Twenty-Seven Thousand Aspiration-Plants, part 107 —Aphorisms
 (1987) Twenty-Seven Thousand Aspiration-Plants, part 108 —Aphorisms
 (1987) Twenty-Seven Thousand Aspiration-Plants, part 109 —Aphorisms
 (1987) Twenty-Seven Thousand Aspiration-Plants, part 110 —Aphorisms
 (1987) Twenty-Seven Thousand Aspiration-Plants, part 111 —Aphorisms
 (1987) Twenty-Seven Thousand Aspiration-Plants, part 112 —Aphorisms
 (1987) Twenty-Seven Thousand Aspiration-Plants, part 113 —Aphorisms
 (1987) Twenty-Seven Thousand Aspiration-Plants, part 114 —Aphorisms
 (1987) Khama Karo —Discourses; Songs (Bengali with translations)
 (1987) Simplicity, Sincerity, Purity and Divinity —Answers
 (1987) Flower-Flames, part 1 —Songs (English)
 (1987) Seventy Rosebuds —Songs (Bengali with translations)
 (1987) Niagara Falls Versus... —Answers
 (1987) A Seeker Is a Singer —Discourses; Talks; Answers; Poetry
 (1987) The Giver and the Receiver —Lectures
 (1987) The Quintessence of Knowledge-Sun —Answers
 (1987) Four Hundred Blue-Green-White-Red Song Birds, part 1 —Songs (Bengali and English)
 (1987) Four Hundred Blue-Green-White-Red Song Birds, part 2 —Songs (Bengali and English)
 (1988) Relaxation-Secrets for the Pressured Mind —Jokes
 (1988) O My Mind —Poetry
 (1988) Oneness-Reality and Perfection-Divinity —Lectures; Answers
 (1988) Ten Divine Secrets —Talks; Answers
 (1988) Twenty-Seven Thousand Aspiration-Plants, part 115 —Aphorisms
 (1988) Fifty-Four Morning Prayer-Cries and Morning Meditation-Smiles —Prayers
 (1988) The Inner World and the Outer World —Talks; Interviews
 (1988) Flower-Flames, part 2 —Songs (English)
 (1988) The Eternal Journey —Answers; Poetry
 (1988) Twenty-Seven Thousand Aspiration-Plants, part 116 —Aphorisms
 (1988) Twenty-Seven Thousand Aspiration-Plants, part 117 —Aphorisms
 (1988) Twenty-Seven Thousand Aspiration-Plants, part 118 —Aphorisms
 (1988) Twenty-Seven Thousand Aspiration-Plants, part 119 —Aphorisms
 (1988) Twenty-Seven Thousand Aspiration-Plants, part 120 —Aphorisms
 (1988) O My Heart —Poetry
 (1988) Twenty-Seven Thousand Aspiration-Plants, part 121 —Aphorisms
 (1988) Lifting Up the World with a Oneness-Heart, 100 lift book —Tributes
 (1988) Come, My Non-English Friends! Let Us Together Climb Up the English Himalayas, part 1 —Poetry; Commentary
 (1989) Twenty-Seven Thousand Aspiration-Plants, part 122 —Aphorisms
 (1989) Twenty-Seven Thousand Aspiration-Plants, part 123 —Aphorisms
 (1989) Twenty-Seven Thousand Aspiration-Plants, part 124 —Aphorisms
 (1989) Twenty-Seven Thousand Aspiration-Plants, part 125 —Aphorisms
 (1989) The World-Experience-Tree-Climber, part 2 —Short stories (autobiographical)
 (1989) The World-Experience-Tree-Climber, part 3 —Short stories (autobiographical)
 (1989) Twenty-Seven Thousand Aspiration-Plants, part 126 —Aphorisms
 (1989) Song-Flowers, part 1 —Songs (English)
 (1989) Song-Flowers, part 2 —Songs (English)
 (1989) Song-Flowers, part 3 —Songs (English)
 (1989) My Silver Jubilee. Rainbow-Heart-Whispers —Poetry; Songs (English)
 (1989) Twenty-Seven Thousand Aspiration-Plants, part 127 —Aphorisms
 (1989) No Problem! I Am My Gorgeous Smile —Songs (English)
 (1989) Song-Flowers, part 4 —Songs (English)
 (1989) Vive La France —Songs (Bengali with translations)
 (1989) I Am a Fool Songbook —Songs (English)
 (1989) The God of the Mind —Poetry
 (1990) The God of the Mind (songbook) —Songs (English)
 (1990) Twenty-Seven Thousand Aspiration-Plants Songbook, part 1 —Songs (English)
 (1989) A Real Member of the United Nations —Aphorisms
 (1989) Perez de Cuellar: Immortality's Rainbow Peace —Tributes
 (1990) Twenty-Seven Thousand Aspiration-Plants, part 128 —Aphorisms
 (1990) Twenty-Seven Thousand Aspiration-Plants, part 129 —Aphorisms
 (1990) Twenty-Seven Thousand Aspiration-Plants, part 130 —Aphorisms
 (1989) Song-Flowers, part 5 —Songs (English)
 (1990) Twenty-Seven Thousand Aspiration-Plants, part 131 —Aphorisms
 (1990) God Is Kidnapped —Poetry
 (1990) Twenty-Seven Thousand Aspiration-Plants, part 132 —Aphorisms
 (1990) President Premadasa: Nectar-Bliss-Heart, Lion-Roar-Soul —Aphorisms
 (1990) Twenty-Seven Thousand Aspiration-Plants, part 133 —Aphorisms
 (1990) Twenty-Seven Thousand Aspiration-Plants, part 134 —Aphorisms
 (1990) Twenty-Seven Thousand Aspiration-Plants, part 135 —Aphorisms
 (1990) Twenty-Seven Thousand Aspiration-Plants, part 136 —Aphorisms
 (1990) My Lord Supreme, Do You Have a Moment? —Poetry
 (1990) Gorbachev: the Master-Key of the Universal Heart —Tributes
 (1990) I Fly in the Heart-Sky of My Dear Supreme —Songs (English)
 (1990) I Want to Be a Twenty-Four Hour God-Dreamer —Songs (English)
 (1990) I Shall Give You My Flower-Heart —Songs (Bengali and English)
 (1990) One Germany, One Soul, One Heart —Songs
 (1990) Silence speaks, part 1 —Poetry (rhyming)
 (1990) Jesus the Seeker, Christ the Saviour —Songs (Bengali with translations)
 (1990) Silence speaks, part 2 —Poetry (rhyming)
 (1991) Twenty-Seven Thousand Aspiration-Plants, part 137 —Aphorisms
 (1991) Twenty-Seven Thousand Aspiration-Plants, part 138 —Aphorisms
 (1991) Twenty-Seven Thousand Aspiration-Plants, part 139 —Aphorisms
 (1991) Twenty-Seven Thousand Aspiration-Plants, part 140 —Aphorisms
 (1991) Twenty-Seven Thousand Aspiration-Plants, part 141 —Aphorisms
 (1991) Twenty-Seven Thousand Aspiration-Plants, part 142 —Aphorisms
 (1991) Twenty-Seven Thousand Aspiration-Plants, part 143 —Aphorisms
 (1991) Twenty-Seven Thousand Aspiration-Plants, part 144 —Aphorisms
 (1991) Twenty-Seven Thousand Aspiration-Plants, part 145 —Aphorisms
 (1991) Twenty-Seven Thousand Aspiration-Plants, part 146 —Aphorisms
 (1991) Twenty-Seven Thousand Aspiration-Plants, part 147 —Aphorisms
 (1991) Twenty-Seven Thousand Aspiration-Plants, part 148 —Aphorisms
 (1991) Twenty-Seven Thousand Aspiration-Plants, part 149 —Aphorisms
 (1991) Twenty-Seven Thousand Aspiration-Plants, part 150 —Aphorisms
 (1991) Twenty-Seven Thousand Aspiration-Plants, part 151 —Aphorisms
 (1991) Concentration, Meditation, Contemplation —Poetry
 (1991) Twenty-Seven Thousand Aspiration-Plants, part 152 —Aphorisms
 (1991) Twenty-Seven Thousand Aspiration-Plants, part 152 —Aphorisms
 (1991) Twenty-Seven Thousand Aspiration-Plants, part 153 —Aphorisms
 (1991) Twenty-Seven Thousand Aspiration-Plants, part 154 —Aphorisms
 (1991) Twenty-Seven Thousand Aspiration-Plants, part 155 —Aphorisms
 (1991) Twenty-Seven Thousand Aspiration-Plants, part 156 —Aphorisms
 (1991) Twenty-Seven Thousand Aspiration-Plants, part 157 —Aphorisms
 (1991) Twenty-Seven Thousand Aspiration-Plants, part 158 —Aphorisms
 (1991) My Child, You and I are in the same Boat —Poetry
 (1991) Laugh, Laugh! Mind-Burden Gone —Jokes
 (1991) My Twenty-Seven Hungry Prayer-Tears —Poetry
 (1991) God Minus —Poetry
 (1991) God Plus —Poetry
 (1991) Twenty-Seven Heart-Fragrance-Dreams —Poetry
 (1991) My Life-Boat's Dream-Reality-Shore —Poetry
 (1991) Twenty-Seven Thousand Aspiration-Plants, part 159 —Aphorisms
 (1991) Twenty-Seven Thousand Aspiration-Plants, part 160 —Aphorisms
 (1991) Twenty-Seven Thousand Aspiration-Plants, part 161 —Aphorisms
 (1991) Song-Flowers, part 6 —Songs (English)
 (1991) Song-Flowers, part 7 —Songs (English)
 (1991) Twenty-Seven Thousand Aspiration-Plants, part 162 —Aphorisms
 (1991) Twenty-Seven Thousand Aspiration-Plants, part 163 —Aphorisms
 (1991) My Gratitude-Flowers for the United Nations —Songs (English)
 (1991) Russia and Russia's God-Blossoming Heart —Answers
 (1991) War: Man's Abysmal Abyss-Plunge, part 1 —Poetry
 (1991) War: Man's Abysmal Abyss-Plunge, part 2 —Poetry
 (1991) Twenty-Seven Thousand Aspiration-Plants, part 164 —Aphorisms
 (1991) Every Day a New Chance —Poetry
 (1991) Each Hour Is a God-Hour —Poetry
 (1991) European Poem-Blossoms —Poetry
 (1991) Carl Lewis: The Champion Inner Runner —Tributes
 (1991) Carl Lewis: The Champion Inner Runner (extended edition) —Tributes
 (1992) Twenty-Seven Thousand Aspiration-Plants, part 165 —Aphorisms
 (1992) Twenty-Seven Thousand Aspiration-Plants, part 166 —Aphorisms
 (1992) Twenty-Seven Thousand Aspiration-Plants, part 167 —Aphorisms
 (1992) Japan: The Morning Sun of the World —Songs (Bengali with translations)
 (1992) Morning Invites My Heart. Evening Invites My Life —Poetry
 (1992) The Core of India's Light, part 1 —Commentary; Aphorisms
 (1992) The Core of India's Light, part 2 —Commentary; Aphorisms
 (1992) The Core of India's Light, part 3 —Commentary; Aphorisms
 (1992) The Core of India's Light, part 4 —Commentary; Aphorisms
 (1992) Sixty-One Gratitude-Blossoms from the World-Head-Home-Garden —Tributes
 (1992) Twenty-Seven Thousand Aspiration-Plants, part 168 —Aphorisms
 (1992) Twenty-Seven Thousand Aspiration-Plants, part 169 —Aphorisms
 (1992) Peace: God's Fragrance-Heart, part 1 —Poetry
 (1992) Peace: God's Fragrance-Heart, part 2 —Poetry
 (1992) Compassion-Forgiveness Songs on Mother Kali —Songs (Bengali with translations)
 (1992) My Song-River-Heart Songbook, part 1 —Songs (English)
 (1992) My God-Master —Poetry
 (1992) I Need This Book —Commentary; Aphorisms
 (1992) Compassion-Sea and Satisfaction-Waves —Discourses
 (1992) Silver Thought-Waves, part 1 —Commentary
 (1992) Silver Thought-Waves, part 2 —Commentary
 (1992) Song-Flowers, part 8 —Songs (English)
 (1992) My Song-River-Heart Songbook, part 2 —Songs (English)
 (1992) May My Heart-Flower Smile Never Fade Away —Songs (English)
 (1992) I Prayerfully Bow... —Songs (sanskrit with translations)
 (1992) Sixty-One Three Line Songs (61 Bengali Songs) —Songs (Bengali)
 (1992) Ami Nil Akasher Nil Pakhi —Songs (Bengali with translations)
 (1992) Twenty-Four Hindu Proverbs Songbook —Songs (English)
 (1992) Ten Thousand Flower-Flames, songbook, part 03 —Songs (English)
 (1992) My Father Shashi Kumar Ghose: Affection-Life, Compassion-Heart, Illumination-Mind —Short stories (autobiographical)
 (1992) Twenty-Seven Thousand Aspiration-Plants, part 170 —Aphorisms
 (1992) Twenty-Seven Thousand Aspiration-Plants, part 171 —Aphorisms
 (1992) Beauty-Discovery —Poetry
 (1992) Twenty-Seven Thousand Aspiration-Plants, part 172 —Aphorisms
 (1992) Twenty-Seven Thousand Aspiration-Plants, part 173 —Aphorisms
 (1992) Twenty-Seven Thousand Aspiration-Plants, part 174 —Aphorisms
 (1992) I Know Why I Am Helpless —Poetry
 (1992) Beautiful Is My Whispering Soul —Poetry
 (1992) Friendship-Birds Fly —Poetry
 (1992) God the Eye and God the Heart —Poetry
 (1992) Twenty-Seven Thousand Aspiration-Plants, part 175 —Aphorisms
 (1992) I Have a Beautiful Smile, I Am a Soulful Cry —Aphorisms
 (1992) The Unreal Heights of Real Absurdities —Answers
 (1992) My Lord, Make Me Your Happiness-Child —Poetry
 (1992) Morning Prayers. Poems on War —Poetry
 (1992) Kalpana Rathe Charibo —Songs (Bengali)
 (1993) This Heart Is Your Heart —Songs (English)
 (1992) My Lord Supreme, I Am Falling Asleep —Poetry
 (1993) Silence Speaks Songbook —Songs (English)
 (1992) Inner Peace and World Peace —Talks; Interviews
 (1992) Truth's Fountain-Melody —Discourses; Interviews
 (1992) A Life of Blossoming Love —Discourses; Interviews
 (1992) Yesterday. Today. Tomorrow. —Poetry
 (1992) My Mind-Confusion Out. My Mind-Illumination In —Poetry
 (1992) I Am Sure —Poetry
 (1992) My God-Prayers and My God-Meditations —Poetry
 (1992) The Oneness-Heart-University —Poetry
 (1993) Somebody Has to Listen —Poetry
 (1992) My God-Commitments —Poetry
 (1992) The Beginning and the Arriving —Poetry
 (1993) My Gratitude-Tears and God's Satisfaction-Smiles —Poetry
 (1993) My Gratitude-Heart-Garden —Poetry
 (1993) A Love-Bathed Heart —Poetry
 (1993) My Eagerness-Heart —Poetry
 (1993) My Perfection-Promise to God —Poetry
 (1993) My Bondage-Life Is My Self-Invention —Poetry
 (1993) O My Heart's Silence-Shore —Songs (Bengali and English)
 (1993) My Surrender-Life-Joy —Songs (Bengali)
 (1993) Love Compassion Forgiveness —Poetry; Tributes
 (1993) Twenty-Seven Thousand Aspiration-Plants, part 176 —Aphorisms
 (1993) Twenty-Seven Thousand Aspiration-Plants, part 177 —Aphorisms
 (1993) Twenty-Seven Thousand Aspiration-Plants, part 178 —Aphorisms
 (1993) Twenty-Seven Thousand Aspiration-Plants, part 179 —Aphorisms
 (1993) Twenty-Seven Thousand Aspiration-Plants, part 180 —Aphorisms
 (1993) Twenty-Seven Thousand Aspiration-Plants, part 181 —Aphorisms
 (1993) Twenty-Seven Thousand Aspiration-Plants, part 182 —Aphorisms
 (1993) Twenty-Seven Thousand Aspiration-Plants, part 183 —Aphorisms
 (1993) Ten Thousand Flower-Flames, songbook, part 04 —Songs (English)
 (1993) O Forgiveness-Ocean —Songs (Bengali and English)
 (1993) Come, My Non-English Friends! Songbook, part 1 —Songs (Bengali and English)
 (1993) Ten Thousand Flower-Flames, songbook, part 05 —Songs (English)
 (1993) God the Mother and God the Father —Poetry
 (1993) Matter and Spirit —Poetry
 (1993) Are You Looking for Your Heart? Here, Come and Take It! —Songs (English)
 (1993) I Implore Your Compassion-Light —Songs (Bengali and English)
 (1993) Japan: Soul-Beauty's Heart-Garden —Commentary
 (1993) Lord Buddha's Compassion-Hand —Commentary
 (1993) Sri Chinmoy with His Upper-Storey-Weak Students —Jokes; Conversations
 (1993) Meetings with Luminaries in the Philippines —Tributes
 (1993) Peace-Blossoms on the Philippine Life-Tree —Tributes; Answers
 (1993) You Are Your Life's Progress-Joy-Drum —Answers
 (1993) Gratitude-Flower-Hearts —Poetry
 (1993) Twenty-Seven Thousand Aspiration-Plants, part 184 —Aphorisms
 (1993) Twenty-Seven Thousand Aspiration-Plants, part 185 —Aphorisms
 (1993) Twenty-Seven Thousand Aspiration-Plants, part 186 —Aphorisms
 (1993) My Heart Shall Give a Oneness-Feast —Answers
 (1993) Poetry: My Rainbow-Heart-Dreams —Discourses; Talks; Poetry
 (1993) The Inner Role of the United Nations —Talks; Interviews
 (1993) Twenty-Seven Thousand Aspiration-Plants, part 187 —Aphorisms
 (1993) The Master Speaks to the Puerto-Rican Disciples, 1966-1972 —Talks
 (1993) Twenty-Seven Thousand Aspiration-Plants, part 188 —Aphorisms
 (1993) Aspiration-Body, Illumination-Soul, part 1 —Answers
 (1993) My Little Heart Is God's Big Hand —Songs (English)
 (1993) Twenty-Seven Thousand Aspiration-Plants, part 189 —Aphorisms
 (1993) Two Brothers: Madal and Chinmoy, part 4 —Commentary; Conversations
 (1993) O My Heart, Where Are You? —Poetry
 (1993) Immediately Start! —Poetry
 (1993) Immediately Stop! —Poetry
 (1993) Aspiration-Body, Illumination-Soul, part 2 —Answers
 (1993) Immediately Start Again! —Poetry
 (1993) Twenty-Seven Thousand Aspiration-Plants, part 190 —Aphorisms
 (1993) Day and Night I Shall Bow —Songs (Bengali and English)
 (1993) I Long to Quench My Heart-Thirst —Songs (Bengali and English)
 (1993) Vivekananda: An Ancient Silence-Heart and A Modern Dynamism-Life —Tributes
 (1993) Related Word Songs —Songs (Bengali)
 (1993) Friendship Songs —Songs (English)
 (1993) Silence Calls Me —Songs (English)
 (1993) In the New Year, a New Dawn —Songs (Bengali and English)
 (1993) Chinese Proverbs —Songs (English)
 (1993) Twenty-Seven Thousand Aspiration-Plants, part 191 —Aphorisms
 (1993) Imagination versus Illumination —Jokes; Conversations
 (1993) Sri Chinmoy in the Amusement Park —Conversations
 (1993) Vivekananda: Divinity's Soul-Rainbow and Humanity's Heart-Blossom —Tributes
 (1993) Twenty-Seven Thousand Aspiration-Plants, part 192 —Aphorisms
 (1993) Twenty-Seven Thousand Aspiration-Plants, part 193 —Aphorisms
 (1993) Twenty-Seven Thousand Aspiration-Plants, part 194 —Aphorisms
 (1993) Twenty-Seven Thousand Aspiration-Plants, part 195 —Aphorisms
 (1993) Kritagyatar Agni Shikha —Songs (Bengali)
 (1993) Tumi Habe Mor Sathi —Songs (Bengali)
 (1993) Twenty-Seven Thousand Aspiration-Plants, part 196 —Aphorisms
 (1993) The World-Experience-Tree-Climber, part 4 —Short stories (autobiographical)
 (1993) The World-Experience-Tree-Climber, part 5 —Short stories (autobiographical)
 (1993) The World-Experience-Tree-Climber, part 6 —Short stories (autobiographical)
 (1993) Twenty-Seven Thousand Aspiration-Plants, part 197 —Aphorisms
 (1993) Twenty-Seven Thousand Aspiration-Plants, part 198 —Aphorisms
 (1993) The World-Experience-Tree-Climber, part 7 —Short stories (autobiographical)
 (1993) Silence speaks, part 3 —Poetry (rhyming)
 (1993) Twenty-Seven Thousand Aspiration-Plants, part 199 —Aphorisms
 (1993) Captain, My Captain —
 (1993) Twenty-Seven Thousand Aspiration-Plants, part 200 —Aphorisms
 (1994) Twenty-Five Aspiration-Flames —Poetry
 (1994) Music: Ecstasy's Heart-Hunger —Tributes
 (1993) Silence speaks, part 4 —Poetry (rhyming)
 (1994) To the Streaming Tears of My Mother's Heart and to the Brimming Smiles of My Mother's Soul —Short stories (autobiographical)
 (1993) Silence speaks, part 5 —Poetry (rhyming)
 (1994) My Mother's Prayer-Tears —Songs (Bengali with translations)
 (1994) Sukher Dine Dukher Rate Songbook —Songs (Bengali)
 (1994) Twenty-Seven Thousand Aspiration-Plants Songbook, part 2 —Songs (English)
 (1993) Come, My Non-English Friends! Songbook, part 2 —Songs (Bengali and English)
 (1994) The Goal Is Won; Songbook —Songs (English)
 (1994) I Love Shopping, part 3 —Short stories (autobiographical)
 (1994) I Love Shopping, part 4 —Short stories (autobiographical)
 (1994) I Love Shopping, part 5 —Short stories (autobiographical)
 (1994) Silence speaks, part 6 —Poetry (rhyming)
 (1994) I Play Tennis Every Day —Discourses; Talks; Poetry
 (1994) New Year's Messages 1966-1994 —Poetry
 (1994) World-Destruction: Never! Impossible! part 1 —Answers
 (1994) World-Destruction: Never! Impossible! part 2 —Answers
 (1994) My Lord, I Pray to You —Prayers
 (1994) My Soul Is Free —Poetry
 (1994) Fast, Faster, Fastest Progress —Poetry
 (1994) Twenty-Seven Thousand Aspiration-Plants, part 201 —Aphorisms
 (1994) I Am My Life's God-Hunger-Heart, part 1 —Poetry
 (1994) I Am My Life's God-Hunger-Heart, part 2 —Poetry
 (1994) I Am My Life's God-Hunger-Heart, part 3 —Poetry
 (1994) I Am My Life's God-Hunger-Heart, part 4 —Poetry
 (1994) My Heart's Peace-Offering —Poetry
 (1994) The Soul's Special Promise, part 1 —Answers
 (1994) God's Compassion-Eye and My Happiness-Heart —Poetry
 (1994) Success-Jumps, Progress-Songs —Poetry
 (1994) Command from God the Justice, Whisper from God the Compassion —Poetry
 (1994) God's Heart I Desire, God's Feet I Choose —Poetry
 (1994) Heaven's Ecstasy-Flames —Poetry
 (1994) Disobedience, Time Is Up! —Poetry
 (1994) Twenty-Seven Thousand Aspiration-Plants, part 202 —Aphorisms
 (1994) My Jealousy Is My Madness-Burden —Poetry
 (1994) Impurity: The Mad Elephant Mental Asylum —Poetry
 (1994) Idleness: The Loneliest Existence in the Entire World —Poetry
 (1994) Twenty-Seven Thousand Aspiration-Plants, part 203 —Aphorisms
 (1994) Silence speaks, part 7 —Poetry (rhyming)
 (1994) Twenty-Seven Thousand Aspiration-Plants, part 204 —Aphorisms
 (1994) No Unreachable Goal —Poetry
 (1994) Silence speaks, part 8 —Poetry (rhyming)
 (1994) Twenty-Seven Thousand Aspiration-Plants, part 205 —Aphorisms
 (1994) Twenty-Seven Thousand Aspiration-Plants, part 206 —Aphorisms
 (1994) Twenty-Seven Thousand Aspiration-Plants, part 207 —Aphorisms
 (1994) Silence speaks, part 9 —Poetry (rhyming)
 (1994) Twenty-Seven Thousand Aspiration-Plants, part 208 —Aphorisms
 (1994) Twenty-Seven Thousand Aspiration-Plants, part 209 —Aphorisms
 (1994) Twenty-Seven Thousand Aspiration-Plants, part 210 —Aphorisms
 (1994) Twenty-Seven Thousand Aspiration-Plants, part 211 —Aphorisms
 (1994) A Seeker's Heart-Song —Answers
 (1994) My God-Obedience —Poetry
 (1994) Twenty-Seven Thousand Aspiration-Plants, part 212 —Aphorisms
 (1994) Uchcha Asha Purna Karo —Songs (Bengali)
 (1994) Asha Bane Ghure Berai. I Am Roaming in the Sweet Hope-Forest —Songs (Bengali)
 (1994) Jakhan Habe Swarga Rajya —Songs (Bengali)
 (1994) No Return On My God-Destination-Road —Poetry
 (1994) Say a Final Farewell to Your Mind's Bondage-Life —Poetry
 (1994) Take Your God-Search Seriously —Poetry
 (1994) My Life's Sixty-Three Heart-Blossoms —Poetry
 (1994) Obedience: Heart-Fragrance —Short stories
 (1994) My Heart-Melody —Answers
 (1994) Twenty-Seven Thousand Aspiration-Plants, part 213 —Aphorisms
 (1994) Twenty-Seven Thousand Aspiration-Plants, part 214 —Aphorisms
 (1994) Twenty-Seven Thousand Aspiration-Plants, part 215 —Aphorisms
 (1994) Twenty-Seven Thousand Aspiration-Plants, part 216 —Aphorisms
 (1994) More Talks to the Puerto Rican Disciples (1970-1973) —Answers
 (1994) Twenty-Seven Thousand Aspiration-Plants, part 217 —Aphorisms
 (1994) Whatever You Want, God Gives —Short stories
 (1994) Twenty-Seven Thousand Aspiration-Plants, part 218 —Aphorisms
 (1994) My Aspiration-Heart's Country-Life-Salutations —Songs (Bengali with translations)
 (1994) Peace-Blossom-Fragrance, part 1 —Poetry
 (1994) Peace-Blossom-Fragrance, part 2 —Poetry
 (1994) Peace-Blossom-Fragrance, part 3 —Poetry
 (1994) Peace-Blossom-Fragrance, part 4 —Poetry
 (1994) Peace-Blossom-Fragrance, part 5 —Poetry
 (1994) Peace-Blossom-Fragrance, part 6 —Poetry
 (1994) Peace-Blossom-Fragrance, part 7 —Poetry
 (1995) Mahatma Gandhi: The Heart of Life —Tributes
 (1995) Twenty-Seven Thousand Aspiration-Plants, part 219 —Aphorisms
 (1995) Twenty-Seven Thousand Aspiration-Plants, part 220 —Aphorisms
 (1995) Twenty-Seven Thousand Aspiration-Plants, part 221 —Aphorisms
 (1995) Peace: God's Heart-Home, part 1 —Poetry
 (1995) Sri Chinmoy Visits India —Short stories (autobiographical)
 (1995) Asha Phul, part 1 —Songs (Bengali)
 (1995) Asha Phul, part 2 —Songs (Bengali)
 (1995) Asha Phul, part 3 —Songs (Bengali)
 (1995) Asha Phul, part 4 —Songs (Bengali)
 (1995) Bhorer Pakhi, part 1 —Songs (Bengali)
 (1995) Bhorer Pakhi, part 2 —Songs (Bengali)
 (1995) Greet the Morning with Your Heart's Aspiration-Cry —Songs (English)
 (1995) Sri Chinmoy Answers, part 01 —Answers
 (1995) The Earth-Illumination-Trumpets of Divinity's Home, part 1 —Short stories
 (1995) The Earth-Illumination-Trumpets of Divinity's Home, part 2 —Short stories
 (1995) Peace: God's Heart-Home, part 2 —Poetry
 (1995) The Earth-Illumination-Trumpets of Divinity's Home, part 3 —Short stories
 (1995) Sri Chinmoy Answers, part 02 —Answers
 (1995) The Secret of Beauty —Poetry
 (1995) Angels —Poetry
 (1995) Friendship —Poetry
 (1995) Meditate On —Aphorisms
 (1995) Sun-Moon-Stars —Poetry
 (1995) August,15th,1945, Songbook —Songs
 (1995) Peace —Poetry
 (1995) My Rose-Road. My Lotus-Home —Poetry
 (1995) Twenty-Seven Thousand Aspiration-Plants, part 222 —Aphorisms
 (1995) Twenty-Seven Thousand Aspiration-Plants, part 223 —Aphorisms
 (1995) Volcano-Agonies of the Seekers —Poetry
 (1995) Twenty-Seven Thousand Aspiration-Plants, part 224 —Aphorisms
 (1995) My Silence-Heart-Blossoms 1 - January - February —Poetry (rhyming)
 (1995) My Silence-Heart-Blossoms 2 - March - April  —Poetry (rhyming)
 (1995) My Silence-Heart-Blossoms 3 - May June  —Poetry (rhyming)
 (1995) Jibaner Bhor —Songs (Bengali with translations)
 (1995) Gahite Chahi Kali Mayer Gan —Songs (Bengali with translations)
 (1995) Asim Pather Jatri Ami —Songs (Bengali)
 (1995) Swapane Amije Birer Ketan Songbook —Songs (Bengali)
 (1995) Tomar Bani Karbo Prachar —Songs (Bengali)
 (1995) Sri Chinmoy Answers, part 03 —Answers
 (1995) Sri Chinmoy Answers, part 04 —Answers
 (1995) My God-Obedience, My God-Disobedience —Songs (English)
 (1995) Four Summit-Height-Melodies Meet with Sri Chinmoy —Tributes; Songs
 (1995) My Meditation-Service at the UN for 25 Years —Answers
 (1995) Twenty-Seven Thousand Aspiration-Plants, part 225 —Aphorisms
 (1995) My Express Visit to India —Short stories (autobiographical)
 (1995) Sri Chinmoy Answers, part 05 —Answers
 (1995) Sri Chinmoy Answers, part 06 —Answers
 (1995) In the Amusement-Enlightenment Heart-Garden of the Lord Supreme —Conversations
 (1995) Sacred Rock Welcomes Sri Chinmoy —Tributes
 (1982) Illumination-Experiences on Indian Soil, part 4 —Short stories
 (1995) Jago Jago Hiya Pakhi —Songs (Bengali and English)
 (1995) Fourteen Hour Peace Concert. Immensity-Peace-Sea-Experiences. Sublimity-Peace-Sky-Realisations: A Fourteen-Hour Peace Concert —Poetry
 (1995) Impossibility Bows —Songs (Bengali)
 (1995) Chinta Dhabal Chinta Amal —Songs (English)
 (1995) I Pray to Become My Heart-Flower —Songs (English)
 (1995) Lord, I Thank You for Your Smile —Songs (English)
 (1996) Power and Love —Poetry
 (1996) Twenty-Seven Thousand Aspiration-Plants, part 226 —Aphorisms
 (1996) Today —Poetry
 (1996) Sri Chinmoy with Four African Peace Immortals —Tributes
 (1996) Twenty-Seven Thousand Aspiration-Plants, part 227 —Aphorisms
 (1996) Twenty-Seven Thousand Aspiration-Plants, part 228 —Aphorisms
 (1996) Hiyar Pradip Ke Jalabe —Songs (Bengali with translations)
 (1996) Kandte Habe Shishur Mato —Songs (Bengali with translations)
 (1996) O Kanaiya Jiban Tari Songbook —Songs (English)
 (1996) Every Day My Gratitude-Heart —Songs (English)
 (1996) Maner Bane Asha Kusum Phutbena —Songs (Bengali)
 (1996) Run and Become. Become and Run, part 18 —Short stories (autobiographical)
 (1996) My Morning Begins —Poetry
 (1996) Run and Become. Become and Run, part 19 —Short stories (autobiographical)
 (1996) Twenty-Seven Thousand Aspiration-Plants, part 229 —Aphorisms
 (1996) Love, Joy, Happiness —Poetry
 (1996) Twenty-Seven Thousand Aspiration-Plants, part 230 —Aphorisms
 (1996) Twenty-Seven Thousand Aspiration-Plants, part 231 —Aphorisms
 (1996) Twenty-Seven Thousand Aspiration-Plants, part 232 —Aphorisms
 (1996) My Evening Descends —Poetry
 (1996) Twenty-Seven Thousand Aspiration-Plants, part 233 —Aphorisms
 (1996) Twenty-Seven Thousand Aspiration-Plants, part 234 —Aphorisms
 (1996) Atma Bhola Shiber Matan —Songs (Bengali)
 (1996) Two God-Amusement-Rivals: My Heart-Song-Beauty and My Life-Dance-Fragrance, part 01 —Poetry
 (1996) Two God-Amusement-Rivals: My Heart-Song-Beauty and My Life-Dance-Fragrance, part 02 —Poetry
 (1996) Two God-Amusement-Rivals: My Heart-Song-Beauty and My Life-Dance-Fragrance, part 03 —Poetry
 (1996) Two God-Amusement-Rivals: My Heart-Song-Beauty and My Life-Dance-Fragrance, part 04 —Poetry
 (1996) Two God-Amusement-Rivals: My Heart-Song-Beauty and My Life-Dance-Fragrance, part 05 —Poetry
 (1996) Two God-Amusement-Rivals: My Heart-Song-Beauty and My Life-Dance-Fragrance, part 06 —Poetry
 (1996) Two God-Amusement-Rivals: My Heart-Song-Beauty and My Life-Dance-Fragrance, part 07 —Poetry
 (1996) Two God-Amusement-Rivals: My Heart-Song-Beauty and My Life-Dance-Fragrance, part 08 —Poetry
 (1996) Two God-Amusement-Rivals: My Heart-Song-Beauty and My Life-Dance-Fragrance, part 09 —Poetry
 (1996) Two God-Amusement-Rivals: My Heart-Song-Beauty and My Life-Dance-Fragrance, part 10 —Poetry
 (1996) Two God-Amusement-Rivals: My Heart-Song-Beauty and My Life-Dance-Fragrance, part 11 —Poetry
 (1996) Two God-Amusement-Rivals: My Heart-Song-Beauty and My Life-Dance-Fragrance, part 12 —Poetry
 (1996) Two God-Amusement-Rivals: My Heart-Song-Beauty and My Life-Dance-Fragrance, part 13 —Poetry
 (1996) August,15th, 1945 —Poetry
 (1996) Compassion-Affection versus Deception-Destruction —Short stories (autobiographical)
 (1996) Bishwa Bidhata Kemane Dekhibo —Songs (Bengali and English)
 (1996) Shanti Lagi Kandbo Ami —Songs (Bengali and English)
 (1996) Sri Chinmoy's Rainbow-Dreams, part 2 —Tributes
 (1996) My Prayerful Salutations to the United Nations —Tributes
 (1996) Sri Chinmoy Answers, part 07 —Answers
 (1996) My Consulate Years —Short stories (autobiographical)
 (1996) Twenty-Seven Thousand Aspiration-Plants, part 235 —Aphorisms
 (1996) Science and Nature —Poetry
 (1997) Mother, Your 50th Independence-Anniversary! I Am Come. Ever in Your Eternity's Cries And Your Infinity's Smiles, Subhas —Tributes
 (1997) I Go Out. I Come In —Poetry
 (1997) Twenty-Seven Thousand Aspiration-Plants, part 236 —Aphorisms
 (1996) Sri Chinmoy Answers, part 08 —Answers
 (1997) Children: God's Dream-Blossoms —Answers
 (1997) Twenty-Seven Thousand Aspiration-Plants, part 237 —Aphorisms
 (1997) Professor-Children: God's Reality-Fruits —Answers
 (1997) Twenty-Seven Thousand Aspiration-Plants Songbook, part 3 —Songs (English)
 (1997) All Can Be Done If the God-Touch Is There —Songs (English)
 (1997) Today God Is Occupying Himself Only with My Life —Songs (English)
 (1997) My God-Master Is the Only One —Songs (English)
 (1997) The Golden Shore Will Beckon You —Songs (Bengali)
 (1997) Namo Namo Namo Shakti Pujari —Songs (Bengali with translations)
 (1997) A Heart of Peace —Songs (English)
 (1997) My Hope Is The Life Of My Heart —Songs (Bengali with translations)
 (1997) Twenty-Seven Thousand Aspiration-Plants, part 238 —Aphorisms
 (1997) Tree of Life —Poetry
 (1997) Dreams —Poetry
 (1997) Morning Dawn —Poetry
 (1997) Alpha and Omega —Songs (Bengali with translations)
 (1997) Mother Teresa: Humanity's Flower-Heart, Divinity's Fragrance-Soul, part 1 —Tributes
 (1997) Twenty-Seven Thousand Aspiration-Plants, part 239 —Aphorisms
 (1997) India, My India. Mother India's Summit-Prides —Poetry
 (1997) Shivaji —Short stories
 (1997) Khudra Amire Bhulite Chahlbo Bhulite —Songs (Bengali)
 (1997) O My Peace-Nest-Heart —Songs (Bengali)
 (1997) God's Perfection-Choice —Songs (Bengali)
 (1997) Mother India: Infinity's Beauty-Eye, Immortality's Fragrance-Heart —Poetry
 (1997) Diana, Princess of Wales, Empress of the World —Tributes
 (1997) Mother Teresa: Humanity's Flower-Heart, Divinity's Fragrance-Soul, part 2 —Tributes
 (1997) Mother Teresa: Humanity's Flower-Heart, Divinity's Fragrance-Soul, part 3 —Tributes
 (1997) Twenty-Seven Thousand Aspiration-Plants, part 240 —Aphorisms
 (1997) A God-Intoxicated Man, Nag Mahashay —Short stories
 (1997) Amusement I Enjoy, Enlightenment I Study, part 1 —Short stories
 (1997) Amusement I Enjoy, Enlightenment I Study, part 2 —Short stories
 (1997) Amusement I Enjoy, Enlightenment I Study, part 3 —Short stories
 (1997) Sri Aurobindo: The Infinite —Discourses; Poetry
 (1997) All Can Be Done If the God-Touch Is There (extended edition) —Tributes
 (1997) Sri Aurobindo: Divinity's Seer-Light —Tributes
 (1997) I Go Out, I Come In (extended edition) —Poetry
 (1998) Amusement I Enjoy, Enlightenment I Study, part 4 —Short stories
 (1998) Amusement I Enjoy, Enlightenment I Study, part 5 —Short stories
 (1998) Amusement I Enjoy, Enlightenment I Study, part 6 —Short stories
 (1998) Amusement I Enjoy, Enlightenment I Study, part 7 —Short stories
 (1998) Twenty-Seven Thousand Aspiration-Plants, part 241 —Aphorisms
 (1998) Twenty-Seven Thousand Aspiration-Plants, part 242 —Aphorisms
 (1998) Twenty-Seven Thousand Aspiration-Plants, part 243 —Aphorisms
 (1998) Twenty-Seven Thousand Aspiration-Plants, part 244 —Aphorisms
 (1998) Twenty-Seven Thousand Aspiration-Plants, part 245 —Aphorisms
 (1998) Twenty-Seven Thousand Aspiration-Plants, part 246 —Aphorisms
 (1998) Seventy-Seven Thousand Service-Trees, part 01 —Aphorisms
 (1998) God's Greatness and God's Goodness —Poetry
 (1998) I Am Flying and Flying and Flying... —Poetry
 (1998) Seventy-Seven Thousand Service-Trees, part 02 —Aphorisms
 (1998) The Difference Between God and Me —Poetry
 (1998) A True Disciple —Poetry
 (1998) Twenty-Seven Thousand Aspiration-Plants, part 247 —Aphorisms
 (1998) Twenty-Seven Thousand Aspiration-Plants, part 248 —Aphorisms
 (1998) Seventy-Seven Thousand Service-Trees, part 03 —Aphorisms
 (1998) My Lord's Lotus-Feet Versus My Devotion-Heart, part 1 —Poetry
 (1998) My Lord's Lotus-Feet Versus My Devotion-Heart, part 2 —Poetry
 (1998) Retirement Not Granted —Poetry
 (1998) Eso Eso Prabhu, part 1 —Songs (Bengali with translations)
 (1998) Twenty-Seven Thousand Aspiration-Plants, part 249 —Aphorisms
 (1998) Twenty-Seven Thousand Aspiration-Plants, part 250 —Aphorisms
 (1998) Seventy-Seven Thousand Service-Trees, part 04 —Aphorisms
 (1998) I Climb Up, I Fall Down —Poetry
 (1998) Vladimir Petrovsky, Builder of a New Heart-Firmament —Poetry
 (1998) Twenty-Seven Thousand Aspiration-Plants, part 251 —Aphorisms
 (1998) Twenty-Seven Thousand Aspiration-Plants, part 252 —Aphorisms
 (1998) Birthdays —Poetry
 (1998) Encouragement —Poetry
 (1998) Sympathy —Poetry
 (1998) Opportunity —Poetry
 (1998) Seventy-Seven Thousand Service-Trees, part 05 —Aphorisms
 (1998) Twenty-Seven Thousand Aspiration-Plants, part 253 —Aphorisms
 (1998) Mridu-di, My First and Foremost Mother of Affection (Mridu Bhashini Devi) —Short stories (autobiographical)
 (1998) Twenty-Seven Thousand Aspiration-Plants, part 254 —Aphorisms
 (1998) Twenty-Seven Thousand Aspiration-Plants, part 255 —Aphorisms
 (1998) Sail My Heartbeat Sail, part 1 —Poetry (rhyming)
 (1998) Twenty-Seven Thousand Aspiration-Plants, part 256 —Aphorisms
 (1998) Seventy-Seven Thousand Service-Trees, part 06 —Aphorisms
 (1998) Twenty-Seven Thousand Aspiration-Plants, part 257 —Aphorisms
 (1998) Sail My Heartbeat Sail, part 2 —Poetry (rhyming)
 (1998) Seventy-Seven Thousand Service-Trees, part 07 —Aphorisms
 (1998) Blessingful Invitations from the University-World —Lectures
 (1998) Eso Eso Prabhu, part 2 —Songs (Bengali with translations)
 (1998) Awake, Awake, My Sweetness-Soul —Songs (Bengali)
 (1998) Twenty-Seven Thousand Aspiration-Plants, part 258 —Aphorisms
 (1998) Twenty-Seven Thousand Aspiration-Plants, part 259 —Aphorisms
 (1998) My Brother Chitta —Short stories (autobiographical)
 (1998) Seventy-Seven Thousand Service-Trees, part 08 —Aphorisms
 (1998) Sadness-Heart-Silence. Madness-Mind-Eloquence —Poetry
 (1998) My Lord's Lotus-Feet Versus My Devotion-Heart, part 3 —Poetry
 (1998) Twenty-Seven Thousand Aspiration-Plants, part 260 —Aphorisms
 (1998) Jainism: Give Life, Take Not —Short stories
 (1998) Seventy-Seven Thousand Service-Trees, part 09 —Aphorisms
 (1998) Philosopher-Thinkers: the Power-Towers of the Mind and Poet-Seers: the Fragrance-Hours of the Heart in the West —Commentary
 (1998) Twenty-Seven Thousand Aspiration-Plants, part 261 —Aphorisms
 (1998) One Hundred and One Unanswered Questions, part 1 —Answers
 (1998) Twenty-Seven Thousand Aspiration-Plants, part 262 —Aphorisms
 (1998) Pioneer-Runners of Tomorrow's World-Peace-Dawn —Talks; Songs
 (1998) Sri Chinmoy with Two Brother-Stars: Narada Michael Walden and Sudhahota Carl Lewis —Tributes
 (1998) Seventy-Seven Thousand Service-Trees, part 10 —Aphorisms
 (1998) Twenty-Seven Thousand Aspiration-Plants, part 263 —Aphorisms
 (1998) Twenty-Seven Thousand Aspiration-Plants, part 264 —Aphorisms
 (1998) Twenty-Seven Thousand Aspiration-Plants, part 265 —Aphorisms
 (1998) Twenty-Seven Thousand Aspiration-Plants, part 266 —Aphorisms
 (1998) Nelson Mandela: The Pinnacle-Pillar of Mother Earth —Tributes
 (1998) Twenty-Seven Thousand Aspiration-Plants, part 267 —Aphorisms
 (1998) The Body's Fitness-Gong, The Soul's Fulness-Song [sic] —Tributes
 (1999) Twenty-Seven Thousand Aspiration-Plants, part 268 —Aphorisms
 (1999) Twenty-Seven Thousand Aspiration-Plants, part 269 —Aphorisms
 (1999) Twenty-Seven Thousand Aspiration-Plants, part 270 —Aphorisms
 (1999) Seventy-Seven Thousand Service-Trees, part 11 —Aphorisms
 (1999) Krishna Bhagaban Sri Madhusudan —Songs (Bengali)
 (1999) Amusement I Enjoy, Enlightenment I Study, part 8 —Short stories
 (1999) My Spirituality —Talks
 (1999) Girish Chandra Ghosh. From the Undivine Tree to the Divine Fruit —Answers
 (1999) My Morning Soul-Body Prayers, part 01 —Prayers
 (1999) My Religion —Poetry
 (1999) Seventy-Seven Thousand Service-Trees, part 12 —Aphorisms
 (1999) Sri Chinmoy Answers, part 09 —Answers
 (1999) My Lord Reads My Letters —Poetry
 (1999) Silence, Please! God Is Coming —Songs (English)
 (1999) Yehudi Menuhin: The Soul-Smile and the Heart-Cry —Tributes
 (1999) My Morning Soul-Body Prayers, part 02 —Prayers
 (1999) Seventy-Seven Thousand Service-Trees, part 13 —Aphorisms
 (1999) Kalpana Rath (Imagination-Chariot) —Songs (Bengali with translations)
 (1999) God Was Simply Shocked —Poetry
 (1999) Sri Chinmoy Answers, part 10 —Answers
 (1999) My Lord, How Can You Be So Heartlessly Cruel to Me? —Poetry
 (1999) Sri Chinmoy Answers, part 11 —Answers
 (1999) Philosophy: Wisdom-Chariot of the Mind —Answers
 (1999) My Morning Soul-Body Prayers, part 03 —Prayers
 (1999) Sri Chinmoy Answers, part 12 —Answers
 (1999) Sri Chinmoy Answers, part 13 —Answers
 (1999) Sri Chinmoy Answers, part 14 —Answers
 (1999) Imagine —Poetry
 (1999) Let It Be —Poetry
 (1999) Harmony —Poetry
 (1999) Sri Chinmoy Answers, part 15 —Answers
 (1999) A Peace-Collecting Pilgrim-Soul —Commentary
 (1999) My Morning Soul-Body Prayers, part 04 —Prayers
 (1999) Seventy-Seven Thousand Service-Trees, part 14 —Aphorisms
 (1999) Sri Chinmoy Answers, part 16 —Answers
 (1999) The New Millennium —Poetry
 (1999) Rani-Di, I Do Know Where You Live —Poetry
 (1999) Sri Chinmoy Answers, part 17 —Answers
 (1999) My Morning Soul-Body Prayers, part 05 —Prayers
 (1999) John Kennedy The World-Treasure-Home —Poetry
 (1999) Amare Karogo Tomar Apan —Songs (Bengali and English)
 (1999) God Answers Prayers —Songs (Bengali and English)
 (1999) An Immediate 'Yes' to God's Every Command —Songs (English)
 (1999) Rainbow-Flowers, part 2  —Commentary
 (1999) My Sweet Father-Lord, Where Are You? —Prayers
 (1999) Divine Enterprise Songbook —Songs (Bengali and English)
 (1999) Sri Chinmoy Answers, part 18 —Answers
 (1999) The Message-Light of the Bhagavad Gita —Poetry
 (1999) The Difference Between a False Master and a True Master —Poetry
 (1999) My Heart-Temple —Poetry
 (1999) My Morning Soul-Body Prayers, part 06 —Prayers
 (1999) A Heart of Oneness-Peace —Poetry
 (1999) Sri Chinmoy Answers, part 19 —Answers
 (1999) O My Aspiration-Heart, Where Are You? —Poetry
 (1999) My Prayer-Life. My Meditation-Heart —Poetry
 (1999) Rainbow-Flowers, part 3  —Commentary
 (1999) My Morning Soul-Body Prayers, part 07 —Prayers
 (1999) Seventy-Seven Thousand Service-Trees, part 15 —Aphorisms
 (1999) Two Divine Qualities: Confidence and Sincerity —Poetry
 (1999) Sri Chinmoy Answers, part 20 —Answers
 (1999) My Morning Soul-Body Prayers, part 08 —Prayers
 (1999) Chander Deshe (In the Moonland) —Songs (Bengali and English)
 (1999) The Soul's Special Promise, part 2 —Answers
 (1999) My Morning Soul-Body Prayers, part 09 —Prayers
 (1999) Seventy-Seven Thousand Service-Trees, part 16 —Aphorisms
 (2000) Seventy-Seven Thousand Service-Trees, part 17 —Aphorisms
 (2000) My Christmas-New Year-Vacation Aspiration-Prayers, part 01 —Prayers
 (2000) My Aspiration-Heart Cycles, part 1 —Poetry
 (2000) Sri Chinmoy Answers, part 21 —Answers
 (2000) My Morning Soul-Body Prayers, part 10 —Prayers
 (2000) My Christmas-New Year-Vacation Aspiration-Prayers, part 02 —Prayers
 (2000) My Christmas-New Year-Vacation Aspiration-Prayers, part 03 —Prayers
 (2000) Religion-Jugglery and God-Discovery —Commentary
 (2000) Choice Wisdom-Fountain-Souls —Commentary
 (2000) A Mystic Journey in the Weightlifting World, part 1 —Interviews
 (2000) Seventy-Seven Thousand Service-Trees, part 18 —Aphorisms
 (2000) Giti Mala —Songs (Bengali with translations)
 (2000) Emperor-Smiles. Orphan-Tears —Poetry
 (2000) Run and Smile. Smile and Run —Answers
 (2000) Sri Chinmoy Answers, part 22 —Answers
 (2000) Enthusiasm Songbook, part 01, Enthusiasm! God's Main Food! —Songs (English)
 (2000) Deshabandu: Bengal's Beloved Friend —Tributes
 (2000) Sri Chinmoy Answers, part 23 —Answers
 (2000) My Morning Soul-Body Prayers, part 11 —Prayers
 (2000) Sri Chinmoy Answers, part 24 —Answers
 (2000) My Morning Soul-Body Prayers, part 12 —Prayers
 (2000) The Moment I Please God in God's Own Way —Poetry
 (2000) Sri Chinmoy Answers, part 25 —Answers
 (2000) My Morning Soul-Body Prayers, part 13 —Prayers
 (2000) Sri Chinmoy Answers, part 26 —Answers
 (2000) One Thousand Lotus Petals Songbook, part 1 —Songs (Bengali with translations)
 (2000) My Sunrise-Heart, part 1 —Poetry
 (2000) Sri Chinmoy Answers, part 27 —Answers
 (2000) My Aspiration-Heart Cycles, part 2 —Poetry
 (2000) Seventy-Seven Thousand Service-Trees, part 19 —Aphorisms
 (2000) Yes, I Can! I Certainly Can!! —Poetry
 (2000) My Admiration for Proverbs from China, Russia and Japan —Songs
 (2000) My Morning Soul-Body Prayers, part 14 —Prayers
 (2000) Sri Chinmoy Answers, part 28 —Answers
 (2000) My Morning Soul-Body Prayers, part 15 —Prayers
 (2000) Walking-Challenging-Becoming, part 1 —Short stories (autobiographical)
 (2000) My Morning Soul-Body Prayers, part 16 —Prayers
 (2000) Aurobindo versus Sri Aurobindo —Poetry
 (2000) The Moghul Emperors —Short stories
 (2000) All My Life-Crimes You Have Forgiven, My Lord Supreme! —Songs (Bengali)
 (2001) Life's Bleeding Tears and Flying Smiles, part 01 —Short stories
 (2001) Seventy-Seven Thousand Service-Trees, part 20 —Aphorisms
 (2001) Sri Chinmoy Answers, part 28 —Answers
 (2001) Life's Bleeding Tears and Flying Smiles, part 02 —Short stories
 (2001) President Gorbachev: the Home of Oneness-Peace-Dream-World —Poetry
 (2001) Life's Bleeding Tears and Flying Smiles, part 03 —Short stories
 (2001) Seventy-Seven Thousand Service-Trees, part 21 —Aphorisms
 (2001) Life's Bleeding Tears and Flying Smiles, part 04 —Short stories
 (2001) Life's Bleeding Tears and Flying Smiles, part 05 —Short stories
 (2001) The Evening Star, part 1 —Songs (Bengali with translations)
 (2001) The Evening Star, part 2 —Songs (Bengali with translations)
 (2001) The Evening Star, part 3 —Songs (Bengali with translations)
 (2001) My Supreme —Songs (English)
 (2001) Enthusiasm Songbook, part 02, Enthusiasm-Bliss —Songs (English)
 (2001) Life's Bleeding Tears and Flying Smiles, part 06 —Short stories
 (2001) Sri Chinmoy in Russia. —Tributes
 (2001) Life's Bleeding Tears and Flying Smiles, part 07 —Short stories
 (2001) Life's Bleeding Tears and Flying Smiles, part 08 —Short stories
 (2001) Life's Bleeding Tears and Flying Smiles, part 09 —Short stories
 (2001) My Life's Every Day Hope-Blossoms and Promise-Tree —Poetry
 (2001) Life's Bleeding Tears and Flying Smiles, part 10 —Short stories
 (2000) My Christmas-New Year-Vacation Aspiration-Prayers, part 04 —Prayers
 (2001) If I Could Start My Life Once More —Poetry
 (2001) Great People and Good People —Poetry
 (2001) Seventy-Seven Thousand Service-Trees, part 22 —Aphorisms
 (2000) My Christmas-New Year-Vacation Aspiration-Prayers, part 05 —Prayers
 (2000) My Christmas-New Year-Vacation Aspiration-Prayers, part 06 —Prayers
 (2001) My Seven Hundred Soul-Bird-Ecstasy-Flights —Drawings
 (2001) My Master —Poetry
 (2001) The Mind-Jungles and the Heart-Gardens of Life —Short stories
 (2001) Here and Now —Poetry
 (2001) My Heart's God-Songs —Songs (English)
 (2001) I Love My Animal Kingdom-Songs —Songs
 (2001) Life's Bleeding Tears and Flying Smiles, part 11 —Short stories
 (2001) To-day Is the Day —Poetry
 (2001) Life's Bleeding Tears and Flying Smiles, part 12 —Short stories
 (2001) Mikhail Gorbachev: the Home of Oneness-Peace-Dream-World Songbook —Songs (Bengali with translations)
 (2001) Sri Chinmoy Answers, part 30 —Answers
 (2001) The Tears and Smiles of a God-Fragrance-Heart —Songs (Bengali)
 (2001) Seventy-Seven Thousand Service-Trees, part 23 —Aphorisms
 (2001) Sri Chinmoy Answers, part 31 —Answers
 (2001) Jharna-Kala Songbook —Songs (Bengali with translations)
 (2002) Seventy-Seven Thousand Service-Trees, part 24 —Aphorisms
 (2002) My Christmas-New Year-Vacation Aspiration-Prayers, part 07 —Prayers
 (2002) My Christmas-New Year-Vacation Aspiration-Prayers, part 08 —Prayers
 (2002) My Christmas-New Year-Vacation Aspiration-Prayers, part 09 —Prayers
 (2002) Seventy-Seven Thousand Service-Trees, part 25 —Aphorisms
 (2002) My Christmas-New Year-Vacation Aspiration-Prayers, part 10 —Prayers
 (2002) Kofi Annan: Cynosure-Eyes —Tributes
 (2002) My Christmas-New Year-Vacation Aspiration-Prayers, part 11 —Prayers
 (2002) Enthusiasm Songbook, part 03 —Songs (English)
 (2001) Sri Chinmoy Answers, part 32 —Answers
 (2002) My Christmas-New Year-Vacation Aspiration-Prayers, part 12 —Prayers
 (2002) My Christmas-New Year-Vacation Aspiration-Prayers, part 13 —Prayers
 (2002) Seventy-Seven Thousand Service-Trees, part 26 —Aphorisms
 (2002) My Christmas-New Year-Vacation Aspiration-Prayers, part 14 —Prayers
 (2002) Pope John Paul II: God's Heart-Prize Winner —Tributes
 (2001) Sri Chinmoy Answers, part 33 —Answers
 (2002) Enthusiasm Songbook, part 04 —Songs (English)
 (2002) Bahir Jagate Bhranti Prabal, part 1 —Songs (Bengali with translations)
 (2002) Bahir Jagate Bhranti Prabal, part 2 —Songs (Bengali with translations)
 (2002) A Crying Heart and a Smiling Soul —Songs
 (2002) Seventy-Seven Thousand Service-Trees, part 27 —Aphorisms
 (2002) The Sage Bhrigu Tests the Cosmic Gods —Short stories
 (2002) The Jackal's Punishment —Short stories
 (2002) Seventy-Seven Thousand Service-Trees, part 28 —Aphorisms
 (2002) Seventy-Seven Thousand Service-Trees, part 29 —Aphorisms
 (2002) Seventy-Seven Thousand Service-Trees, part 30 —Aphorisms
 (2003) The Tiny Key in the Asparagus Soup —Short stories
 (2003) My Christmas-New Year-Vacation Aspiration-Prayers, part 15 —Prayers
 (2003) Seventy-Seven Thousand Service-Trees, part 31 —Aphorisms
 (2003) My Christmas-New Year-Vacation Aspiration-Prayers, part 16 —Prayers
 (2003) My Christmas-New Year-Vacation Aspiration-Prayers, part 17 —Prayers
 (2003) Enthusiasm Songbook, part 05 —Songs (English)
 (2003) Khunjite Chahigo Tomar Nayan Pujite Chahigo Tomar Charan Songbook, part 1 —Songs (Bengali with translations)
 (2003) My Christmas-New Year-Vacation Aspiration-Prayers, part 18 —Prayers
 (2003) My Christmas-New Year-Vacation Aspiration-Prayers, part 19 —Prayers
 (2003) The Speeding Driver —Short stories
 (2003) Seventy-Seven Thousand Service-Trees, part 32 —Aphorisms
 (2003) My Christmas-New Year-Vacation Aspiration-Prayers, part 20 —Prayers
 (2003) Dhanite Chahigo Amar Jiban 2 —Songs (Bengali with translations)
 (2003) The Mind Loves the Heart, the Mind Becomes the Heart, part 1. Sri Chinmoy's ninth visit to the University of Oxford —Lectures; Commentary
 (2003) The Mind Loves the Heart, the Mind Becomes the Heart, part 2. Sri Chinmoy's ninth visit to King's College, the University of Cambridge —Lectures; Commentary
 (2003) My Christmas-New Year-Vacation Aspiration-Prayers, part 21 —Prayers
 (2003) Seventy-Seven Thousand Service-Trees, part 33 —Aphorisms
 (2003) The Oneness of the Eastern Heart and the Western Mind, part 1 —Lectures
 (2003) Seventy-Seven Thousand Service-Trees, part 34 —Aphorisms
 (2003) The Street Beggar —Poetry
 (2003) My Complete God-Surrender-Song —Songs
 (2003) How Nolini-da Wanted Me to Be His Secretary —Short stories (autobiographical)
 (2004) My Christmas-New Year-Vacation Aspiration-Prayers, part 22 —Prayers
 (2004) My Christmas-New Year-Vacation Aspiration-Prayers, part 23 —Prayers
 (2004) My Christmas-New Year-Vacation Aspiration-Prayers, part 24 —Prayers
 (2004) My Christmas-New Year-Vacation Aspiration-Prayers, part 25 —Prayers
 (2004) My Christmas-New Year-Vacation Aspiration-Prayers, part 26 —Prayers
 (2004) Seventy-Seven Thousand Service-Trees, part 35 —Aphorisms
 (2004) Archbishop Desmond Tutu: the world-Compassion-Heart-Nest —Tributes
 (2004) My Christmas-New Year-Vacation Aspiration-Prayers, part 27 —Prayers
 (2004) My Christmas-New Year-Vacation Aspiration-Prayers, part 28 —Prayers
 (2004) My Christmas-New Year-Vacation Aspiration-Prayers, part 29 —Prayers
 (2004) The Oneness of the Eastern Heart and the Western Mind, part 2 —Lectures
 (2004) Sri Chinmoy Answers, part 34 —Answers
 (2004) Ashar Duar, part 1 —Songs (Bengali with translations)
 (2004) My Christmas-New Year-Vacation Aspiration-Prayers, part 30 —Prayers
 (2004) Seventy-Seven Thousand Service-Trees, part 36 —Aphorisms
 (2004) Seventy-Seven Thousand Service-Trees, part 37 —Aphorisms
 (2004) To-morrow's Noon —Aphorisms
 (2004) Enthusiasm Songbook, part 06 —Songs (English)
 (2004) Seventy-Seven Thousand Service-Trees, part 38 —Aphorisms
 (2004) Sri Chinmoy Answers, part 35 —Answers
 (2004) The Oneness of the Eastern Heart and the Western Mind, part 3 —Lectures
 (2004) Run and Become. Become and Run, part 20 —Short stories (autobiographical)
 (2004) Enthusiasm Songbook, part 07 —Songs (English)
 (2004) Seventy-Seven Thousand Service-Trees, part 39 —Aphorisms
 (2004) I Bow to the Soul of the Parliament of Religions - Barcelona —Commentary
 (2004) Asta Rabi —Songs (Bengali with translations)
 (2004) Ashar Duar, part 2 —Songs (Bengali with translations)
 (2004) I Prayerfully Bow to the Soul of Russian —Lectures; Poetry
 (2004) A Mystic Journey in the Weightlifting World, part 2 —Short stories (autobiographical)
 (2004) Sri Chinmoy Answers, part 36 —Answers
 (2004) Seventy-Seven Thousand Service-Trees, part 40 —Aphorisms
 (2004) A Mystic Journey in the Weightlifting World, part 3 —Short stories (autobiographical)
 (2004) My Weightlifting Tears and Smiles, part 3 —Short stories (autobiographical)
 (2004) Aspiration-Body, Illumination-Soul, part 3 —Answers
 (2004) A Mystic Journey in the Weightlifting World, part 4 —Short stories (autobiographical)
 (2004) My Race-Prayers, Part 1 —Prayers
 (2005) Run and Become. Become and Run, part 21 —Short stories (autobiographical)
 (2005) The World-Experience-Tree-Climber, part 8 —Short stories (autobiographical)
 (2005) God's Glance and God's Grace —Poetry
 (2005) The Heart-Tears of a God-Seeker —Commentary
 (2005) Seventy-Seven Thousand Service-Trees, part 41 —Aphorisms
 (2005) My Christmas-New Year-Vacation Aspiration-Prayers, part 31 —Prayers
 (2005) My Christmas-New Year-Vacation Aspiration-Prayers, part 32 —Prayers
 (2005) My Early Morning Prayer-Journeys, part 1 —Prayers
 (2005) Paramer Tripti songs —Songs (Bengali)
 (2005) Sri Chinmoy Answers, part 37 —Answers
 (2005) Seventy-Seven Thousand Service-Trees, part 42 —Aphorisms
 (2005) Fifty Oneness-Heart-Songs of a Perfect God and a Perfect Child —Poetry
 (2005) Gan Likkhi Am, Part 1 —Songs (Bengali with translations)
 (2005) My Christmas-New Year-Vacation Aspiration-Prayers, part 33 —Prayers
 (2005) The United Nations: The World√ïs Oneness-Home —Poetry
 (2005) Seventy-Seven Thousand Service-Trees, part 43 —Aphorisms
 (2005) Walking-Challenging-Becoming, part 2 —Short stories (autobiographical)
 (2005) My Morning Soul-Body Prayers, part 17 —Prayers
 (2005) Sri Chinmoy Answers, part 38 —Answers
 (2005) My Christmas-New Year-Vacation Aspiration-Prayers, part 34 —Prayers
 (2005) My Early Morning Prayer-Journeys, part 2 —Prayers
 (2005) The Master and the Circus Clown (illustrated) —Short stories
 (2005) Gan Likkhi Ami, Part 2 —Songs (Bengali with translations)
 (2005) Guru, My Question Is —Answers
 (2005) Lahiri Mahashoy: A Revelation of the Beyond —Short stories
 (2005) Age Does Not Matter —Poetry
 (2005) Enthusiasm Songbook, part 08 —Songs (English)
 (2005) Seventy-Seven Thousand Service-Trees, part 44 —Aphorisms
 (2005) My Christmas-New Year-Vacation Aspiration-Prayers, part 35 —Prayers
 (2005) God's Magnet Eyes —Commentary; Aphorisms
 (2005) My Christmas-New Year-Vacation Aspiration-Prayers, part 36 —Prayers
 (2005) My Christmas-New Year-Vacation Aspiration-Prayers, part 37 —Prayers
 (2005) My Christmas-New Year-Vacation Aspiration-Prayers, part 38 —Prayers
 (2005) Enthusiasm Songbook, part 09 —Songs (English)
 (2005) My Christmas-New Year-Vacation Aspiration-Prayers, part 39 —Prayers
 (2005) My Morning Soul-Body Prayers, part 18 —Prayers
 (2006) The Bloom of My Lotus-Heart —Songs (Bengali)
 (2006) Seventy-Seven Thousand Service-Trees, part 45 —Aphorisms
 (2006) God's Heart-Room —Commentary; Aphorisms
 (2006) My Morning Soul-Body Prayers, part 19 —Prayers
 (2006) Guru the Heart, Ongkar the Soul —Prayers
 (2006) Enthusiasm Songbook, part 10 —Songs (English)
 (2006) My Christmas-New Year-Vacation Aspiration-Prayers, part 40 —Prayers
 (2006) My Christmas-New Year-Vacation Aspiration-Prayers, part 41 —Prayers
 (2006) My Morning Soul-Body Prayers, part 20 —Prayers
 (2005) My Christmas-New Year-Vacation Aspiration-Prayers, part 42 —Prayers
 (2006) A God-Devotion-Teardrop —Songs (English)
 (2006) Seventy-Seven Thousand Service-Trees, part 46 —Aphorisms
 (2006) Sundaratama Dekha Dilo Aji, Part 1 —Songs (Bengali with translations)
 (2006) My Race-Prayers, Part 2 —Prayers
 (2006) Sundaratama Dekha Dilo Aji, Part 2 —Songs (Bengali with translations)
 (2006) Jatra Amar Shesh Habe Aj —Songs (Bengali with translations)
 (2006) My Christmas-New Year-Vacation Aspiration-Prayers, part 43 —Prayers
 (2006) My Blessingful and Pride-Flooded Dedication to the Indomitable Runners of the 3100-mile Self-Transcendence Race —Prayers
 (2006) My Christmas-New Year-Vacation Aspiration-Prayers, part 44 —Prayers
 (2006) My Morning Soul-Body Prayers, part 21 —Prayers
 (2006) My Early Morning Heart-Climbing-Prayers —Prayers
 (2006) My Christmas-New Year-Vacation Aspiration-Prayers, part 45 —Prayers
 (2006) The Lotus-Grove of My Heart —Poetry
 (2006) My Christmas-New Year-Vacation Aspiration-Prayers, part 46 —Prayers
 (2006) My Christmas-New Year-Vacation Aspiration-Prayers, part 47 —Prayers
 (2006) My Christmas-New Year-Vacation Aspiration-Prayers, part 48 —Prayers
 (2006) My Christmas-New Year-Vacation Aspiration-Prayers, part 49 —Prayers
 (2007) My Christmas-New Year-Vacation Aspiration-Prayers, part 50 —Prayers
 (2007) My Christmas-New Year-Vacation Aspiration-Prayers, part 51 —Prayers
 (2007) My Christmas-New Year-Vacation Aspiration-Prayers, part 52 —Prayers
 (2007) Conversations with Sri Chinmoy —Answers
 (2007) Swadeshe Bideshe Ghuriya Berai —Songs (Bengali with translations)
 (2007) Transfiguration —Short stories
 (2007)  The Inner Meaning of Sport  —Answers
 (2007) My Dilip-da-Adoration —Short stories
 (2007) My Cycling Experiences in this Life —Short stories (autobiographical)
 (2007) Seventy-Seven Thousand Service-Trees, part 47 —Aphorisms
 (2007) My Blessingful and Pride-Flooded Dedication to the Indomitable Runners of the 3100-mile Self-Transcendence Race 2008 (Sri Chinmoy's Handwriting) —Poetry
 (2007) Seventy-Seven Thousand Service-Trees, part 48 —Aphorisms
 (2008) My Christmas-New Year-Vacation Aspiration-Prayers, part 53 —Prayers
 (2008) My Christmas-New Year-Vacation Aspiration-Prayers, part 54 —Prayers
 (2008) My Christmas-New Year-Vacation Aspiration-Prayers, part 55 —Prayers
 (2008) My Christmas-New Year-Vacation Aspiration-Prayers, part 56 —Prayers
 (2008) My Christmas-New Year-Vacation Aspiration-Prayers, part 57 —Prayers
 (2008) My Christmas-New Year-Vacation Aspiration-Prayers, part 58 —Prayers
 (2008) My Christmas-New Year-Vacation Aspiration-Prayers, part 59 —Prayers
 (2008) My Christmas-New Year-Vacation Aspiration-Prayers, part 60 —Prayers
 (2008) My Christmas-New Year-Vacation Aspiration-Prayers, part 61 —Prayers
 (2008) Enthusiasm Songbook, part 11 —Songs (English)
 (2008) Seventy-Seven Thousand Service-Trees, part 49 —Aphorisms
 (2008) Seventy-Seven Thousand Service-Trees, part 50 —Aphorisms
 (2008) Paradise Is Where I Bend My Knees —Songs (English)
 (2008) My Race-Prayers, part 3 —Prayers
 (2009) Your Face Is My Dream —Songs (Bengali with translations)
 (2009) My Book of Tea and Coffee Experiences —Short stories
 (2008) My God-Hunger-Cry —Poetry
 (2008) Kheya Heri Neye Heri —Songs
 (2011) Living in the eternal Now —Discourses

References 

Sri Chinmoy
Chinmoy, Sri
Chinmoy, Sri
Modern yoga books